

536001–536100 

|-bgcolor=#E9E9E9
| 536001 ||  || — || January 23, 2015 || Haleakala || Pan-STARRS ||  || align=right data-sort-value="0.89" | 890 m || 
|-id=002 bgcolor=#d6d6d6
| 536002 ||  || — || January 23, 2015 || Haleakala || Pan-STARRS ||  || align=right | 1.9 km || 
|-id=003 bgcolor=#E9E9E9
| 536003 ||  || — || January 23, 2015 || Haleakala || Pan-STARRS ||  || align=right | 1.7 km || 
|-id=004 bgcolor=#E9E9E9
| 536004 ||  || — || January 20, 2010 || WISE || WISE ||  || align=right data-sort-value="0.99" | 990 m || 
|-id=005 bgcolor=#E9E9E9
| 536005 ||  || — || January 27, 2015 || Haleakala || Pan-STARRS ||  || align=right | 1.4 km || 
|-id=006 bgcolor=#d6d6d6
| 536006 ||  || — || January 28, 2015 || Haleakala || Pan-STARRS ||  || align=right | 2.0 km || 
|-id=007 bgcolor=#E9E9E9
| 536007 ||  || — || January 12, 2010 || Mount Lemmon || Mount Lemmon Survey ||  || align=right | 1.4 km || 
|-id=008 bgcolor=#E9E9E9
| 536008 ||  || — || January 28, 2015 || Haleakala || Pan-STARRS ||  || align=right | 1.8 km || 
|-id=009 bgcolor=#E9E9E9
| 536009 ||  || — || January 22, 2006 || Mount Lemmon || Mount Lemmon Survey ||  || align=right | 1.6 km || 
|-id=010 bgcolor=#d6d6d6
| 536010 ||  || — || May 12, 2010 || WISE || WISE ||  || align=right | 2.1 km || 
|-id=011 bgcolor=#d6d6d6
| 536011 ||  || — || January 16, 2015 || Haleakala || Pan-STARRS ||  || align=right | 2.9 km || 
|-id=012 bgcolor=#d6d6d6
| 536012 ||  || — || August 14, 2012 || Haleakala || Pan-STARRS ||  || align=right | 2.9 km || 
|-id=013 bgcolor=#d6d6d6
| 536013 ||  || — || August 10, 2007 || Kitt Peak || Spacewatch ||  || align=right | 2.3 km || 
|-id=014 bgcolor=#d6d6d6
| 536014 ||  || — || October 14, 2013 || Mount Lemmon || Mount Lemmon Survey ||  || align=right | 2.6 km || 
|-id=015 bgcolor=#d6d6d6
| 536015 ||  || — || November 12, 2013 || Mount Lemmon || Mount Lemmon Survey ||  || align=right | 2.1 km || 
|-id=016 bgcolor=#d6d6d6
| 536016 ||  || — || October 11, 2012 || Haleakala || Pan-STARRS ||  || align=right | 2.6 km || 
|-id=017 bgcolor=#d6d6d6
| 536017 ||  || — || October 3, 1997 || Kitt Peak || Spacewatch ||  || align=right | 2.5 km || 
|-id=018 bgcolor=#d6d6d6
| 536018 ||  || — || November 26, 2013 || Mount Lemmon || Mount Lemmon Survey ||  || align=right | 2.9 km || 
|-id=019 bgcolor=#d6d6d6
| 536019 ||  || — || November 26, 2013 || Mount Lemmon || Mount Lemmon Survey ||  || align=right | 2.8 km || 
|-id=020 bgcolor=#d6d6d6
| 536020 ||  || — || October 4, 2003 || Kitt Peak || Spacewatch ||  || align=right | 2.2 km || 
|-id=021 bgcolor=#E9E9E9
| 536021 ||  || — || September 3, 2008 || Kitt Peak || Spacewatch ||  || align=right | 1.7 km || 
|-id=022 bgcolor=#d6d6d6
| 536022 ||  || — || October 13, 2007 || Mount Lemmon || Mount Lemmon Survey ||  || align=right | 2.2 km || 
|-id=023 bgcolor=#E9E9E9
| 536023 ||  || — || November 6, 2005 || Mount Lemmon || Mount Lemmon Survey ||  || align=right data-sort-value="0.71" | 710 m || 
|-id=024 bgcolor=#E9E9E9
| 536024 ||  || — || January 17, 2015 || Haleakala || Pan-STARRS ||  || align=right data-sort-value="0.80" | 800 m || 
|-id=025 bgcolor=#E9E9E9
| 536025 ||  || — || November 17, 2009 || Mount Lemmon || Mount Lemmon Survey ||  || align=right data-sort-value="0.81" | 810 m || 
|-id=026 bgcolor=#E9E9E9
| 536026 ||  || — || January 17, 2015 || Haleakala || Pan-STARRS ||  || align=right data-sort-value="0.86" | 860 m || 
|-id=027 bgcolor=#E9E9E9
| 536027 ||  || — || November 30, 2005 || Mount Lemmon || Mount Lemmon Survey ||  || align=right data-sort-value="0.88" | 880 m || 
|-id=028 bgcolor=#fefefe
| 536028 ||  || — || October 1, 2005 || Mount Lemmon || Mount Lemmon Survey ||  || align=right data-sort-value="0.72" | 720 m || 
|-id=029 bgcolor=#E9E9E9
| 536029 ||  || — || June 30, 2008 || Kitt Peak || Spacewatch ||  || align=right | 1.5 km || 
|-id=030 bgcolor=#E9E9E9
| 536030 ||  || — || September 25, 2009 || Kitt Peak || Spacewatch ||  || align=right | 1.1 km || 
|-id=031 bgcolor=#fefefe
| 536031 ||  || — || February 7, 2011 || Mount Lemmon || Mount Lemmon Survey ||  || align=right data-sort-value="0.72" | 720 m || 
|-id=032 bgcolor=#E9E9E9
| 536032 ||  || — || April 28, 2011 || Kitt Peak || Spacewatch ||  || align=right | 1.1 km || 
|-id=033 bgcolor=#E9E9E9
| 536033 ||  || — || April 30, 2011 || Mount Lemmon || Mount Lemmon Survey ||  || align=right | 1.0 km || 
|-id=034 bgcolor=#fefefe
| 536034 ||  || — || November 1, 2005 || Mount Lemmon || Mount Lemmon Survey ||  || align=right data-sort-value="0.84" | 840 m || 
|-id=035 bgcolor=#fefefe
| 536035 ||  || — || January 28, 2015 || Haleakala || Pan-STARRS ||  || align=right data-sort-value="0.60" | 600 m || 
|-id=036 bgcolor=#E9E9E9
| 536036 ||  || — || October 29, 2005 || Mount Lemmon || Mount Lemmon Survey ||  || align=right | 1.7 km || 
|-id=037 bgcolor=#E9E9E9
| 536037 ||  || — || October 3, 2013 || Kitt Peak || Spacewatch ||  || align=right | 1.8 km || 
|-id=038 bgcolor=#E9E9E9
| 536038 ||  || — || January 21, 2015 || Haleakala || Pan-STARRS ||  || align=right | 1.7 km || 
|-id=039 bgcolor=#E9E9E9
| 536039 ||  || — || July 29, 2008 || Kitt Peak || Spacewatch ||  || align=right | 1.8 km || 
|-id=040 bgcolor=#E9E9E9
| 536040 ||  || — || January 26, 2006 || Mount Lemmon || Mount Lemmon Survey ||  || align=right | 1.1 km || 
|-id=041 bgcolor=#E9E9E9
| 536041 ||  || — || January 26, 2006 || Kitt Peak || Spacewatch ||  || align=right | 1.4 km || 
|-id=042 bgcolor=#E9E9E9
| 536042 ||  || — || January 28, 2006 || Mount Lemmon || Mount Lemmon Survey ||  || align=right | 1.1 km || 
|-id=043 bgcolor=#E9E9E9
| 536043 ||  || — || March 9, 2006 || Kitt Peak || Spacewatch ||  || align=right | 1.9 km || 
|-id=044 bgcolor=#E9E9E9
| 536044 ||  || — || February 24, 2006 || Mount Lemmon || Mount Lemmon Survey ||  || align=right | 1.8 km || 
|-id=045 bgcolor=#d6d6d6
| 536045 ||  || — || January 28, 2015 || Haleakala || Pan-STARRS ||  || align=right | 3.4 km || 
|-id=046 bgcolor=#d6d6d6
| 536046 ||  || — || November 3, 2007 || Mount Lemmon || Mount Lemmon Survey ||  || align=right | 2.8 km || 
|-id=047 bgcolor=#E9E9E9
| 536047 ||  || — || January 16, 2015 || Haleakala || Pan-STARRS ||  || align=right | 1.4 km || 
|-id=048 bgcolor=#E9E9E9
| 536048 ||  || — || November 1, 2013 || Mount Lemmon || Mount Lemmon Survey ||  || align=right | 2.2 km || 
|-id=049 bgcolor=#E9E9E9
| 536049 ||  || — || March 14, 2007 || Mount Lemmon || Mount Lemmon Survey ||  || align=right data-sort-value="0.66" | 660 m || 
|-id=050 bgcolor=#E9E9E9
| 536050 ||  || — || February 10, 2007 || Mount Lemmon || Mount Lemmon Survey ||  || align=right | 1.1 km || 
|-id=051 bgcolor=#fefefe
| 536051 ||  || — || March 15, 2008 || Mount Lemmon || Mount Lemmon Survey ||  || align=right data-sort-value="0.70" | 700 m || 
|-id=052 bgcolor=#E9E9E9
| 536052 ||  || — || January 27, 2007 || Mount Lemmon || Mount Lemmon Survey ||  || align=right | 1.1 km || 
|-id=053 bgcolor=#fefefe
| 536053 ||  || — || March 2, 2011 || Kitt Peak || Spacewatch ||  || align=right data-sort-value="0.75" | 750 m || 
|-id=054 bgcolor=#fefefe
| 536054 ||  || — || January 23, 2015 || Haleakala || Pan-STARRS ||  || align=right data-sort-value="0.82" | 820 m || 
|-id=055 bgcolor=#fefefe
| 536055 ||  || — || January 28, 2007 || Kitt Peak || Spacewatch ||  || align=right data-sort-value="0.80" | 800 m || 
|-id=056 bgcolor=#d6d6d6
| 536056 ||  || — || February 1, 2009 || Kitt Peak || Spacewatch ||  || align=right | 2.6 km || 
|-id=057 bgcolor=#E9E9E9
| 536057 ||  || — || August 14, 2012 || Haleakala || Pan-STARRS ||  || align=right | 2.4 km || 
|-id=058 bgcolor=#fefefe
| 536058 ||  || — || January 26, 2015 || Haleakala || Pan-STARRS ||  || align=right data-sort-value="0.58" | 580 m || 
|-id=059 bgcolor=#E9E9E9
| 536059 ||  || — || December 26, 2014 || Haleakala || Pan-STARRS ||  || align=right data-sort-value="0.69" | 690 m || 
|-id=060 bgcolor=#E9E9E9
| 536060 ||  || — || February 25, 2007 || Mount Lemmon || Mount Lemmon Survey || critical || align=right data-sort-value="0.71" | 710 m || 
|-id=061 bgcolor=#fefefe
| 536061 ||  || — || May 15, 2012 || Haleakala || Pan-STARRS ||  || align=right data-sort-value="0.71" | 710 m || 
|-id=062 bgcolor=#E9E9E9
| 536062 ||  || — || March 19, 2010 || Mount Lemmon || Mount Lemmon Survey ||  || align=right | 2.0 km || 
|-id=063 bgcolor=#d6d6d6
| 536063 ||  || — || August 26, 2012 || Haleakala || Pan-STARRS ||  || align=right | 2.5 km || 
|-id=064 bgcolor=#d6d6d6
| 536064 ||  || — || October 14, 2012 || Catalina || CSS ||  || align=right | 3.2 km || 
|-id=065 bgcolor=#d6d6d6
| 536065 ||  || — || April 24, 2006 || Kitt Peak || Spacewatch ||  || align=right | 3.0 km || 
|-id=066 bgcolor=#d6d6d6
| 536066 ||  || — || March 10, 2005 || Mount Lemmon || Mount Lemmon Survey ||  || align=right | 2.1 km || 
|-id=067 bgcolor=#d6d6d6
| 536067 ||  || — || April 5, 2010 || Mount Lemmon || Mount Lemmon Survey ||  || align=right | 3.2 km || 
|-id=068 bgcolor=#E9E9E9
| 536068 ||  || — || December 28, 2014 || Mount Lemmon || Mount Lemmon Survey ||  || align=right | 2.1 km || 
|-id=069 bgcolor=#E9E9E9
| 536069 ||  || — || April 7, 2007 || Mount Lemmon || Mount Lemmon Survey ||  || align=right | 1.2 km || 
|-id=070 bgcolor=#d6d6d6
| 536070 ||  || — || October 15, 2007 || Mount Lemmon || Mount Lemmon Survey ||  || align=right | 3.0 km || 
|-id=071 bgcolor=#d6d6d6
| 536071 ||  || — || August 25, 2012 || Kitt Peak || Spacewatch ||  || align=right | 3.2 km || 
|-id=072 bgcolor=#d6d6d6
| 536072 ||  || — || January 21, 2015 || Haleakala || Pan-STARRS ||  || align=right | 2.5 km || 
|-id=073 bgcolor=#E9E9E9
| 536073 ||  || — || April 14, 2011 || Mount Lemmon || Mount Lemmon Survey ||  || align=right data-sort-value="0.84" | 840 m || 
|-id=074 bgcolor=#E9E9E9
| 536074 ||  || — || March 25, 2007 || Mount Lemmon || Mount Lemmon Survey ||  || align=right | 1.3 km || 
|-id=075 bgcolor=#d6d6d6
| 536075 ||  || — || September 8, 2001 || Socorro || LINEAR ||  || align=right | 3.3 km || 
|-id=076 bgcolor=#d6d6d6
| 536076 ||  || — || August 12, 2012 || Catalina || CSS ||  || align=right | 2.3 km || 
|-id=077 bgcolor=#d6d6d6
| 536077 ||  || — || October 8, 2007 || Catalina || CSS ||  || align=right | 3.4 km || 
|-id=078 bgcolor=#d6d6d6
| 536078 ||  || — || December 4, 2007 || Mount Lemmon || Mount Lemmon Survey ||  || align=right | 2.5 km || 
|-id=079 bgcolor=#d6d6d6
| 536079 ||  || — || October 30, 2007 || Mount Lemmon || Mount Lemmon Survey ||  || align=right | 2.4 km || 
|-id=080 bgcolor=#E9E9E9
| 536080 ||  || — || October 23, 2012 || Kitt Peak || Spacewatch ||  || align=right | 2.0 km || 
|-id=081 bgcolor=#d6d6d6
| 536081 ||  || — || May 23, 2011 || Mount Lemmon || Mount Lemmon Survey ||  || align=right | 2.9 km || 
|-id=082 bgcolor=#d6d6d6
| 536082 ||  || — || August 26, 2012 || Haleakala || Pan-STARRS ||  || align=right | 2.7 km || 
|-id=083 bgcolor=#d6d6d6
| 536083 ||  || — || August 10, 2012 || Kitt Peak || Spacewatch ||  || align=right | 2.8 km || 
|-id=084 bgcolor=#d6d6d6
| 536084 ||  || — || September 17, 2012 || Mount Lemmon || Mount Lemmon Survey ||  || align=right | 2.7 km || 
|-id=085 bgcolor=#d6d6d6
| 536085 ||  || — || December 7, 2013 || Haleakala || Pan-STARRS ||  || align=right | 2.2 km || 
|-id=086 bgcolor=#d6d6d6
| 536086 ||  || — || January 23, 2015 || Haleakala || Pan-STARRS ||  || align=right | 2.7 km || 
|-id=087 bgcolor=#E9E9E9
| 536087 ||  || — || November 8, 2008 || Kitt Peak || Spacewatch ||  || align=right | 1.9 km || 
|-id=088 bgcolor=#d6d6d6
| 536088 ||  || — || November 8, 2007 || Kitt Peak || Spacewatch ||  || align=right | 3.1 km || 
|-id=089 bgcolor=#d6d6d6
| 536089 ||  || — || April 9, 2010 || Mount Lemmon || Mount Lemmon Survey ||  || align=right | 2.4 km || 
|-id=090 bgcolor=#d6d6d6
| 536090 ||  || — || March 10, 2005 || Anderson Mesa || LONEOS ||  || align=right | 3.4 km || 
|-id=091 bgcolor=#d6d6d6
| 536091 ||  || — || January 24, 2015 || Haleakala || Pan-STARRS ||  || align=right | 2.8 km || 
|-id=092 bgcolor=#d6d6d6
| 536092 ||  || — || January 28, 2015 || Haleakala || Pan-STARRS ||  || align=right | 3.6 km || 
|-id=093 bgcolor=#d6d6d6
| 536093 ||  || — || October 12, 2007 || Mount Lemmon || Mount Lemmon Survey ||  || align=right | 2.6 km || 
|-id=094 bgcolor=#d6d6d6
| 536094 ||  || — || November 17, 2007 || Mount Lemmon || Mount Lemmon Survey ||  || align=right | 2.9 km || 
|-id=095 bgcolor=#d6d6d6
| 536095 ||  || — || January 28, 2015 || Haleakala || Pan-STARRS ||  || align=right | 2.7 km || 
|-id=096 bgcolor=#d6d6d6
| 536096 ||  || — || January 28, 2015 || Haleakala || Pan-STARRS ||  || align=right | 2.2 km || 
|-id=097 bgcolor=#d6d6d6
| 536097 ||  || — || January 28, 2015 || Haleakala || Pan-STARRS ||  || align=right | 2.4 km || 
|-id=098 bgcolor=#E9E9E9
| 536098 ||  || — || January 29, 2015 || Haleakala || Pan-STARRS ||  || align=right data-sort-value="0.70" | 700 m || 
|-id=099 bgcolor=#d6d6d6
| 536099 ||  || — || September 10, 2007 || Mount Lemmon || Mount Lemmon Survey ||  || align=right | 2.4 km || 
|-id=100 bgcolor=#d6d6d6
| 536100 ||  || — || January 4, 2014 || Haleakala || Pan-STARRS ||  || align=right | 2.7 km || 
|}

536101–536200 

|-bgcolor=#d6d6d6
| 536101 ||  || — || April 4, 2010 || Catalina || CSS ||  || align=right | 3.7 km || 
|-id=102 bgcolor=#fefefe
| 536102 ||  || — || April 29, 2008 || Mount Lemmon || Mount Lemmon Survey ||  || align=right data-sort-value="0.69" | 690 m || 
|-id=103 bgcolor=#E9E9E9
| 536103 ||  || — || January 2, 2011 || Mount Lemmon || Mount Lemmon Survey ||  || align=right | 1.6 km || 
|-id=104 bgcolor=#fefefe
| 536104 ||  || — || January 20, 2015 || Haleakala || Pan-STARRS ||  || align=right data-sort-value="0.52" | 520 m || 
|-id=105 bgcolor=#E9E9E9
| 536105 ||  || — || January 21, 2015 || Haleakala || Pan-STARRS ||  || align=right | 1.1 km || 
|-id=106 bgcolor=#fefefe
| 536106 ||  || — || January 30, 2011 || Haleakala || Pan-STARRS ||  || align=right data-sort-value="0.78" | 780 m || 
|-id=107 bgcolor=#fefefe
| 536107 ||  || — || April 24, 2008 || Mount Lemmon || Mount Lemmon Survey ||  || align=right data-sort-value="0.85" | 850 m || 
|-id=108 bgcolor=#d6d6d6
| 536108 ||  || — || November 27, 2013 || Haleakala || Pan-STARRS ||  || align=right | 3.0 km || 
|-id=109 bgcolor=#d6d6d6
| 536109 ||  || — || October 8, 2012 || Haleakala || Pan-STARRS ||  || align=right | 3.3 km || 
|-id=110 bgcolor=#d6d6d6
| 536110 ||  || — || January 26, 2015 || Haleakala || Pan-STARRS ||  || align=right | 3.1 km || 
|-id=111 bgcolor=#fefefe
| 536111 ||  || — || December 25, 2003 || Kitt Peak || Spacewatch ||  || align=right data-sort-value="0.73" | 730 m || 
|-id=112 bgcolor=#fefefe
| 536112 ||  || — || September 9, 2013 || Haleakala || Pan-STARRS ||  || align=right data-sort-value="0.77" | 770 m || 
|-id=113 bgcolor=#d6d6d6
| 536113 ||  || — || March 2, 2009 || Mount Lemmon || Mount Lemmon Survey ||  || align=right | 3.0 km || 
|-id=114 bgcolor=#d6d6d6
| 536114 ||  || — || January 17, 2015 || Haleakala || Pan-STARRS ||  || align=right | 1.7 km || 
|-id=115 bgcolor=#E9E9E9
| 536115 ||  || — || October 2, 2013 || Mount Lemmon || Mount Lemmon Survey ||  || align=right | 1.4 km || 
|-id=116 bgcolor=#E9E9E9
| 536116 ||  || — || September 15, 2013 || Haleakala || Pan-STARRS ||  || align=right | 1.8 km || 
|-id=117 bgcolor=#E9E9E9
| 536117 ||  || — || September 25, 2008 || Mount Lemmon || Mount Lemmon Survey ||  || align=right | 1.5 km || 
|-id=118 bgcolor=#d6d6d6
| 536118 ||  || — || November 29, 2013 || Haleakala || Pan-STARRS ||  || align=right | 2.9 km || 
|-id=119 bgcolor=#d6d6d6
| 536119 ||  || — || November 8, 2013 || Mount Lemmon || Mount Lemmon Survey ||  || align=right | 2.5 km || 
|-id=120 bgcolor=#fefefe
| 536120 ||  || — || January 23, 2015 || Haleakala || Pan-STARRS ||  || align=right data-sort-value="0.80" | 800 m || 
|-id=121 bgcolor=#d6d6d6
| 536121 ||  || — || October 8, 2012 || Haleakala || Pan-STARRS ||  || align=right | 2.7 km || 
|-id=122 bgcolor=#d6d6d6
| 536122 ||  || — || August 25, 2012 || Kitt Peak || Spacewatch ||  || align=right | 3.1 km || 
|-id=123 bgcolor=#d6d6d6
| 536123 ||  || — || March 29, 2009 || Catalina || CSS ||  || align=right | 2.9 km || 
|-id=124 bgcolor=#d6d6d6
| 536124 ||  || — || December 26, 2013 || Mount Lemmon || Mount Lemmon Survey ||  || align=right | 2.5 km || 
|-id=125 bgcolor=#d6d6d6
| 536125 ||  || — || January 2, 2009 || Mount Lemmon || Mount Lemmon Survey ||  || align=right | 3.0 km || 
|-id=126 bgcolor=#fefefe
| 536126 ||  || — || February 5, 2000 || Kitt Peak || Spacewatch ||  || align=right data-sort-value="0.73" | 730 m || 
|-id=127 bgcolor=#E9E9E9
| 536127 ||  || — || November 2, 2013 || Mount Lemmon || Mount Lemmon Survey ||  || align=right | 1.4 km || 
|-id=128 bgcolor=#E9E9E9
| 536128 ||  || — || October 2, 2013 || Mount Lemmon || Mount Lemmon Survey ||  || align=right | 1.9 km || 
|-id=129 bgcolor=#E9E9E9
| 536129 ||  || — || November 18, 2009 || Mount Lemmon || Mount Lemmon Survey ||  || align=right | 1.9 km || 
|-id=130 bgcolor=#E9E9E9
| 536130 ||  || — || October 3, 2013 || Haleakala || Pan-STARRS ||  || align=right | 1.4 km || 
|-id=131 bgcolor=#fefefe
| 536131 ||  || — || January 12, 2011 || Mount Lemmon || Mount Lemmon Survey ||  || align=right data-sort-value="0.75" | 750 m || 
|-id=132 bgcolor=#E9E9E9
| 536132 ||  || — || October 27, 2008 || Kitt Peak || Spacewatch ||  || align=right | 1.9 km || 
|-id=133 bgcolor=#E9E9E9
| 536133 ||  || — || January 23, 2015 || Haleakala || Pan-STARRS ||  || align=right data-sort-value="0.95" | 950 m || 
|-id=134 bgcolor=#E9E9E9
| 536134 ||  || — || March 13, 2011 || Mount Lemmon || Mount Lemmon Survey ||  || align=right | 1.4 km || 
|-id=135 bgcolor=#E9E9E9
| 536135 ||  || — || December 19, 2009 || Mount Lemmon || Mount Lemmon Survey ||  || align=right | 2.4 km || 
|-id=136 bgcolor=#E9E9E9
| 536136 ||  || — || January 29, 2015 || Haleakala || Pan-STARRS ||  || align=right | 1.0 km || 
|-id=137 bgcolor=#d6d6d6
| 536137 ||  || — || November 16, 2006 || Mount Lemmon || Mount Lemmon Survey ||  || align=right | 3.7 km || 
|-id=138 bgcolor=#d6d6d6
| 536138 ||  || — || January 16, 2015 || Haleakala || Pan-STARRS ||  || align=right | 2.1 km || 
|-id=139 bgcolor=#E9E9E9
| 536139 ||  || — || August 18, 2009 || Kitt Peak || Spacewatch ||  || align=right | 1.3 km || 
|-id=140 bgcolor=#E9E9E9
| 536140 ||  || — || December 24, 2005 || Kitt Peak || Spacewatch ||  || align=right | 1.9 km || 
|-id=141 bgcolor=#fefefe
| 536141 ||  || — || December 22, 2003 || Kitt Peak || Spacewatch ||  || align=right data-sort-value="0.63" | 630 m || 
|-id=142 bgcolor=#d6d6d6
| 536142 ||  || — || May 24, 2010 || WISE || WISE ||  || align=right | 1.7 km || 
|-id=143 bgcolor=#E9E9E9
| 536143 ||  || — || January 6, 2006 || Socorro || LINEAR ||  || align=right | 1.7 km || 
|-id=144 bgcolor=#E9E9E9
| 536144 ||  || — || November 25, 2009 || Kitt Peak || Spacewatch ||  || align=right | 1.9 km || 
|-id=145 bgcolor=#d6d6d6
| 536145 ||  || — || March 17, 1996 || Kitt Peak || Spacewatch ||  || align=right | 2.7 km || 
|-id=146 bgcolor=#fefefe
| 536146 ||  || — || November 3, 2007 || Mount Lemmon || Mount Lemmon Survey ||  || align=right data-sort-value="0.83" | 830 m || 
|-id=147 bgcolor=#d6d6d6
| 536147 ||  || — || August 19, 2006 || Kitt Peak || Spacewatch ||  || align=right | 3.3 km || 
|-id=148 bgcolor=#fefefe
| 536148 ||  || — || November 1, 2007 || Kitt Peak || Spacewatch ||  || align=right data-sort-value="0.57" | 570 m || 
|-id=149 bgcolor=#E9E9E9
| 536149 ||  || — || March 23, 2003 || Kitt Peak || Spacewatch ||  || align=right | 1.0 km || 
|-id=150 bgcolor=#E9E9E9
| 536150 ||  || — || September 22, 2008 || Catalina || CSS ||  || align=right | 2.5 km || 
|-id=151 bgcolor=#E9E9E9
| 536151 ||  || — || January 26, 2006 || Kitt Peak || Spacewatch ||  || align=right | 1.9 km || 
|-id=152 bgcolor=#d6d6d6
| 536152 ||  || — || September 9, 2007 || Kitt Peak || Spacewatch ||  || align=right | 3.4 km || 
|-id=153 bgcolor=#E9E9E9
| 536153 ||  || — || September 13, 2013 || Catalina || CSS ||  || align=right | 1.8 km || 
|-id=154 bgcolor=#E9E9E9
| 536154 ||  || — || September 6, 2008 || Mount Lemmon || Mount Lemmon Survey ||  || align=right | 2.0 km || 
|-id=155 bgcolor=#E9E9E9
| 536155 ||  || — || November 9, 2013 || Haleakala || Pan-STARRS ||  || align=right | 1.1 km || 
|-id=156 bgcolor=#d6d6d6
| 536156 ||  || — || January 17, 2015 || Mount Lemmon || Mount Lemmon Survey ||  || align=right | 3.0 km || 
|-id=157 bgcolor=#E9E9E9
| 536157 ||  || — || January 7, 2006 || Kitt Peak || Spacewatch ||  || align=right | 1.9 km || 
|-id=158 bgcolor=#E9E9E9
| 536158 ||  || — || March 29, 2011 || Mount Lemmon || Mount Lemmon Survey ||  || align=right | 1.7 km || 
|-id=159 bgcolor=#E9E9E9
| 536159 ||  || — || April 5, 2011 || Kitt Peak || Spacewatch ||  || align=right | 2.1 km || 
|-id=160 bgcolor=#E9E9E9
| 536160 ||  || — || March 16, 2007 || Kitt Peak || Spacewatch ||  || align=right data-sort-value="0.86" | 860 m || 
|-id=161 bgcolor=#E9E9E9
| 536161 ||  || — || January 8, 2011 || Mount Lemmon || Mount Lemmon Survey ||  || align=right data-sort-value="0.94" | 940 m || 
|-id=162 bgcolor=#E9E9E9
| 536162 ||  || — || October 13, 2005 || Kitt Peak || Spacewatch ||  || align=right data-sort-value="0.88" | 880 m || 
|-id=163 bgcolor=#d6d6d6
| 536163 ||  || — || September 26, 2006 || Kitt Peak || Spacewatch ||  || align=right | 2.4 km || 
|-id=164 bgcolor=#E9E9E9
| 536164 ||  || — || May 12, 2011 || Mount Lemmon || Mount Lemmon Survey ||  || align=right | 1.6 km || 
|-id=165 bgcolor=#d6d6d6
| 536165 ||  || — || December 31, 2013 || Haleakala || Pan-STARRS ||  || align=right | 2.8 km || 
|-id=166 bgcolor=#E9E9E9
| 536166 ||  || — || October 26, 2009 || Kitt Peak || Spacewatch ||  || align=right data-sort-value="0.88" | 880 m || 
|-id=167 bgcolor=#E9E9E9
| 536167 ||  || — || April 19, 2007 || Kitt Peak || Spacewatch ||  || align=right data-sort-value="0.73" | 730 m || 
|-id=168 bgcolor=#E9E9E9
| 536168 ||  || — || September 17, 2003 || Kitt Peak || Spacewatch ||  || align=right | 1.9 km || 
|-id=169 bgcolor=#E9E9E9
| 536169 ||  || — || September 28, 2003 || Kitt Peak || Spacewatch ||  || align=right | 2.5 km || 
|-id=170 bgcolor=#E9E9E9
| 536170 ||  || — || September 10, 2004 || Kitt Peak || Spacewatch ||  || align=right | 1.6 km || 
|-id=171 bgcolor=#E9E9E9
| 536171 ||  || — || March 6, 2011 || Kitt Peak || Spacewatch ||  || align=right data-sort-value="0.68" | 680 m || 
|-id=172 bgcolor=#fefefe
| 536172 ||  || — || January 18, 2008 || Kitt Peak || Spacewatch ||  || align=right data-sort-value="0.87" | 870 m || 
|-id=173 bgcolor=#E9E9E9
| 536173 ||  || — || September 23, 2008 || Kitt Peak || Spacewatch ||  || align=right | 1.1 km || 
|-id=174 bgcolor=#d6d6d6
| 536174 ||  || — || March 21, 2004 || Kitt Peak || Spacewatch ||  || align=right | 3.2 km || 
|-id=175 bgcolor=#d6d6d6
| 536175 ||  || — || October 20, 2006 || Mount Lemmon || Mount Lemmon Survey || 7:4 || align=right | 3.3 km || 
|-id=176 bgcolor=#E9E9E9
| 536176 ||  || — || September 28, 2008 || Catalina || CSS ||  || align=right | 1.7 km || 
|-id=177 bgcolor=#E9E9E9
| 536177 ||  || — || April 7, 2007 || Mount Lemmon || Mount Lemmon Survey ||  || align=right data-sort-value="0.77" | 770 m || 
|-id=178 bgcolor=#E9E9E9
| 536178 ||  || — || January 28, 2015 || Haleakala || Pan-STARRS ||  || align=right | 2.0 km || 
|-id=179 bgcolor=#E9E9E9
| 536179 ||  || — || May 21, 2011 || Mount Lemmon || Mount Lemmon Survey ||  || align=right data-sort-value="0.84" | 840 m || 
|-id=180 bgcolor=#E9E9E9
| 536180 ||  || — || October 28, 2008 || Kitt Peak || Spacewatch ||  || align=right | 1.9 km || 
|-id=181 bgcolor=#d6d6d6
| 536181 ||  || — || January 16, 2015 || Haleakala || Pan-STARRS ||  || align=right | 2.2 km || 
|-id=182 bgcolor=#d6d6d6
| 536182 ||  || — || October 28, 2013 || Catalina || CSS ||  || align=right | 3.0 km || 
|-id=183 bgcolor=#E9E9E9
| 536183 ||  || — || January 17, 2015 || Haleakala || Pan-STARRS ||  || align=right data-sort-value="0.89" | 890 m || 
|-id=184 bgcolor=#E9E9E9
| 536184 ||  || — || October 28, 2005 || Catalina || CSS ||  || align=right | 1.5 km || 
|-id=185 bgcolor=#E9E9E9
| 536185 ||  || — || January 20, 2015 || Haleakala || Pan-STARRS ||  || align=right | 1.4 km || 
|-id=186 bgcolor=#fefefe
| 536186 ||  || — || March 18, 2005 || Catalina || CSS ||  || align=right data-sort-value="0.73" | 730 m || 
|-id=187 bgcolor=#E9E9E9
| 536187 ||  || — || December 29, 2005 || Mount Lemmon || Mount Lemmon Survey ||  || align=right | 2.2 km || 
|-id=188 bgcolor=#E9E9E9
| 536188 ||  || — || October 7, 2004 || Kitt Peak || Spacewatch ||  || align=right | 1.7 km || 
|-id=189 bgcolor=#E9E9E9
| 536189 ||  || — || August 20, 1995 || Kitt Peak || Spacewatch ||  || align=right | 2.0 km || 
|-id=190 bgcolor=#d6d6d6
| 536190 ||  || — || October 1, 2003 || Kitt Peak || Spacewatch ||  || align=right | 2.8 km || 
|-id=191 bgcolor=#E9E9E9
| 536191 ||  || — || November 27, 2009 || Mount Lemmon || Mount Lemmon Survey ||  || align=right | 1.9 km || 
|-id=192 bgcolor=#fefefe
| 536192 ||  || — || January 4, 2011 || Mount Lemmon || Mount Lemmon Survey ||  || align=right data-sort-value="0.63" | 630 m || 
|-id=193 bgcolor=#E9E9E9
| 536193 ||  || — || April 2, 2011 || Haleakala || Pan-STARRS ||  || align=right | 1.1 km || 
|-id=194 bgcolor=#d6d6d6
| 536194 ||  || — || October 20, 2007 || Mount Lemmon || Mount Lemmon Survey ||  || align=right | 2.5 km || 
|-id=195 bgcolor=#E9E9E9
| 536195 ||  || — || November 3, 2005 || Kitt Peak || Spacewatch ||  || align=right | 1.0 km || 
|-id=196 bgcolor=#E9E9E9
| 536196 ||  || — || November 6, 2005 || Mount Lemmon || Mount Lemmon Survey ||  || align=right | 1.3 km || 
|-id=197 bgcolor=#d6d6d6
| 536197 ||  || — || November 12, 2013 || Haleakala || Pan-STARRS ||  || align=right | 2.9 km || 
|-id=198 bgcolor=#fefefe
| 536198 ||  || — || February 27, 2008 || Mount Lemmon || Mount Lemmon Survey ||  || align=right data-sort-value="0.64" | 640 m || 
|-id=199 bgcolor=#d6d6d6
| 536199 ||  || — || February 13, 2010 || WISE || WISE ||  || align=right | 2.9 km || 
|-id=200 bgcolor=#fefefe
| 536200 ||  || — || October 3, 2010 || Catalina || CSS ||  || align=right data-sort-value="0.87" | 870 m || 
|}

536201–536300 

|-bgcolor=#fefefe
| 536201 ||  || — || November 7, 2007 || Kitt Peak || Spacewatch ||  || align=right data-sort-value="0.67" | 670 m || 
|-id=202 bgcolor=#fefefe
| 536202 ||  || — || October 17, 2007 || Mount Lemmon || Mount Lemmon Survey ||  || align=right data-sort-value="0.57" | 570 m || 
|-id=203 bgcolor=#fefefe
| 536203 ||  || — || January 18, 2015 || Kitt Peak || Spacewatch ||  || align=right data-sort-value="0.83" | 830 m || 
|-id=204 bgcolor=#E9E9E9
| 536204 ||  || — || January 23, 2006 || Mount Lemmon || Mount Lemmon Survey ||  || align=right | 1.8 km || 
|-id=205 bgcolor=#d6d6d6
| 536205 ||  || — || November 12, 2007 || Mount Lemmon || Mount Lemmon Survey ||  || align=right | 2.3 km || 
|-id=206 bgcolor=#d6d6d6
| 536206 ||  || — || January 23, 2015 || Haleakala || Pan-STARRS ||  || align=right | 2.6 km || 
|-id=207 bgcolor=#d6d6d6
| 536207 ||  || — || January 28, 2015 || Haleakala || Pan-STARRS ||  || align=right | 2.3 km || 
|-id=208 bgcolor=#E9E9E9
| 536208 ||  || — || October 24, 2005 || Kitt Peak || Spacewatch ||  || align=right | 1.3 km || 
|-id=209 bgcolor=#fefefe
| 536209 ||  || — || January 10, 2011 || Mount Lemmon || Mount Lemmon Survey ||  || align=right data-sort-value="0.68" | 680 m || 
|-id=210 bgcolor=#E9E9E9
| 536210 ||  || — || February 10, 2011 || Mount Lemmon || Mount Lemmon Survey ||  || align=right data-sort-value="0.93" | 930 m || 
|-id=211 bgcolor=#d6d6d6
| 536211 ||  || — || January 13, 2005 || Kitt Peak || Spacewatch ||  || align=right | 2.7 km || 
|-id=212 bgcolor=#fefefe
| 536212 ||  || — || December 13, 2010 || Mount Lemmon || Mount Lemmon Survey ||  || align=right data-sort-value="0.56" | 560 m || 
|-id=213 bgcolor=#E9E9E9
| 536213 ||  || — || January 27, 2006 || Anderson Mesa || LONEOS ||  || align=right | 2.3 km || 
|-id=214 bgcolor=#d6d6d6
| 536214 ||  || — || April 18, 2010 || WISE || WISE ||  || align=right | 2.5 km || 
|-id=215 bgcolor=#E9E9E9
| 536215 ||  || — || March 4, 2011 || Catalina || CSS ||  || align=right | 1.6 km || 
|-id=216 bgcolor=#E9E9E9
| 536216 ||  || — || April 3, 2011 || Haleakala || Pan-STARRS ||  || align=right | 1.3 km || 
|-id=217 bgcolor=#d6d6d6
| 536217 ||  || — || February 4, 2005 || Kitt Peak || Spacewatch ||  || align=right | 2.4 km || 
|-id=218 bgcolor=#E9E9E9
| 536218 ||  || — || January 29, 2015 || Haleakala || Pan-STARRS ||  || align=right | 2.3 km || 
|-id=219 bgcolor=#E9E9E9
| 536219 ||  || — || July 13, 2013 || Mount Lemmon || Mount Lemmon Survey ||  || align=right | 1.8 km || 
|-id=220 bgcolor=#d6d6d6
| 536220 ||  || — || November 25, 2013 || Haleakala || Pan-STARRS ||  || align=right | 3.0 km || 
|-id=221 bgcolor=#E9E9E9
| 536221 ||  || — || March 13, 2010 || WISE || WISE ||  || align=right | 3.1 km || 
|-id=222 bgcolor=#E9E9E9
| 536222 ||  || — || December 11, 2010 || Mount Lemmon || Mount Lemmon Survey ||  || align=right | 1.3 km || 
|-id=223 bgcolor=#fefefe
| 536223 ||  || — || March 17, 2004 || Kitt Peak || Spacewatch ||  || align=right data-sort-value="0.81" | 810 m || 
|-id=224 bgcolor=#E9E9E9
| 536224 ||  || — || September 5, 2008 || Kitt Peak || Spacewatch ||  || align=right | 2.1 km || 
|-id=225 bgcolor=#fefefe
| 536225 ||  || — || November 5, 2010 || Mount Lemmon || Mount Lemmon Survey ||  || align=right data-sort-value="0.80" | 800 m || 
|-id=226 bgcolor=#fefefe
| 536226 ||  || — || April 13, 2008 || Kitt Peak || Spacewatch ||  || align=right data-sort-value="0.56" | 560 m || 
|-id=227 bgcolor=#fefefe
| 536227 ||  || — || November 7, 2010 || Mount Lemmon || Mount Lemmon Survey ||  || align=right data-sort-value="0.72" | 720 m || 
|-id=228 bgcolor=#fefefe
| 536228 ||  || — || January 16, 2015 || Haleakala || Pan-STARRS ||  || align=right data-sort-value="0.76" | 760 m || 
|-id=229 bgcolor=#E9E9E9
| 536229 ||  || — || August 25, 2004 || Kitt Peak || Spacewatch ||  || align=right | 1.9 km || 
|-id=230 bgcolor=#d6d6d6
| 536230 ||  || — || October 29, 2008 || Kitt Peak || Spacewatch ||  || align=right | 1.7 km || 
|-id=231 bgcolor=#E9E9E9
| 536231 ||  || — || October 26, 2009 || Kitt Peak || Spacewatch ||  || align=right | 1.2 km || 
|-id=232 bgcolor=#E9E9E9
| 536232 ||  || — || January 21, 2015 || Haleakala || Pan-STARRS ||  || align=right data-sort-value="0.95" | 950 m || 
|-id=233 bgcolor=#E9E9E9
| 536233 ||  || — || March 9, 2011 || Kitt Peak || Spacewatch ||  || align=right | 1.4 km || 
|-id=234 bgcolor=#d6d6d6
| 536234 ||  || — || January 21, 2015 || Haleakala || Pan-STARRS ||  || align=right | 2.7 km || 
|-id=235 bgcolor=#fefefe
| 536235 ||  || — || January 9, 2011 || Mount Lemmon || Mount Lemmon Survey ||  || align=right data-sort-value="0.62" | 620 m || 
|-id=236 bgcolor=#E9E9E9
| 536236 ||  || — || March 12, 2007 || Kitt Peak || Spacewatch ||  || align=right data-sort-value="0.68" | 680 m || 
|-id=237 bgcolor=#E9E9E9
| 536237 ||  || — || May 23, 2011 || Mount Lemmon || Mount Lemmon Survey ||  || align=right | 1.2 km || 
|-id=238 bgcolor=#E9E9E9
| 536238 ||  || — || November 22, 2014 || Mount Lemmon || Mount Lemmon Survey ||  || align=right | 1.7 km || 
|-id=239 bgcolor=#E9E9E9
| 536239 ||  || — || December 28, 2014 || Mount Lemmon || Mount Lemmon Survey ||  || align=right | 1.5 km || 
|-id=240 bgcolor=#E9E9E9
| 536240 ||  || — || October 15, 2009 || Catalina || CSS ||  || align=right | 1.6 km || 
|-id=241 bgcolor=#d6d6d6
| 536241 ||  || — || December 20, 2009 || Mount Lemmon || Mount Lemmon Survey ||  || align=right | 2.5 km || 
|-id=242 bgcolor=#E9E9E9
| 536242 ||  || — || January 30, 2011 || Kitt Peak || Spacewatch ||  || align=right data-sort-value="0.77" | 770 m || 
|-id=243 bgcolor=#fefefe
| 536243 ||  || — || October 28, 2006 || Mount Lemmon || Mount Lemmon Survey ||  || align=right data-sort-value="0.59" | 590 m || 
|-id=244 bgcolor=#E9E9E9
| 536244 ||  || — || November 18, 2009 || Kitt Peak || Spacewatch ||  || align=right | 1.3 km || 
|-id=245 bgcolor=#E9E9E9
| 536245 ||  || — || April 3, 2011 || Haleakala || Pan-STARRS ||  || align=right | 1.3 km || 
|-id=246 bgcolor=#E9E9E9
| 536246 ||  || — || April 12, 2011 || Catalina || CSS ||  || align=right | 2.4 km || 
|-id=247 bgcolor=#E9E9E9
| 536247 ||  || — || May 12, 2012 || Mount Lemmon || Mount Lemmon Survey ||  || align=right | 1.3 km || 
|-id=248 bgcolor=#d6d6d6
| 536248 ||  || — || January 13, 2010 || Mount Lemmon || Mount Lemmon Survey ||  || align=right | 2.4 km || 
|-id=249 bgcolor=#E9E9E9
| 536249 ||  || — || April 27, 2012 || Haleakala || Pan-STARRS ||  || align=right | 1.0 km || 
|-id=250 bgcolor=#E9E9E9
| 536250 ||  || — || February 4, 2011 || Haleakala || Pan-STARRS ||  || align=right | 1.8 km || 
|-id=251 bgcolor=#fefefe
| 536251 ||  || — || February 12, 2004 || Kitt Peak || Spacewatch ||  || align=right data-sort-value="0.59" | 590 m || 
|-id=252 bgcolor=#d6d6d6
| 536252 ||  || — || April 9, 2010 || Mount Lemmon || Mount Lemmon Survey ||  || align=right | 2.7 km || 
|-id=253 bgcolor=#d6d6d6
| 536253 ||  || — || January 4, 2014 || Mount Lemmon || Mount Lemmon Survey ||  || align=right | 3.2 km || 
|-id=254 bgcolor=#E9E9E9
| 536254 ||  || — || April 3, 2011 || Haleakala || Pan-STARRS ||  || align=right data-sort-value="0.75" | 750 m || 
|-id=255 bgcolor=#E9E9E9
| 536255 ||  || — || May 24, 2007 || Mount Lemmon || Mount Lemmon Survey ||  || align=right | 2.0 km || 
|-id=256 bgcolor=#d6d6d6
| 536256 ||  || — || April 17, 2005 || Kitt Peak || Spacewatch ||  || align=right | 2.5 km || 
|-id=257 bgcolor=#E9E9E9
| 536257 ||  || — || September 9, 2008 || Mount Lemmon || Mount Lemmon Survey ||  || align=right | 2.0 km || 
|-id=258 bgcolor=#E9E9E9
| 536258 ||  || — || January 29, 2015 || Haleakala || Pan-STARRS ||  || align=right | 1.5 km || 
|-id=259 bgcolor=#d6d6d6
| 536259 ||  || — || February 2, 2009 || Mount Lemmon || Mount Lemmon Survey ||  || align=right | 2.9 km || 
|-id=260 bgcolor=#d6d6d6
| 536260 ||  || — || September 15, 2007 || Mount Lemmon || Mount Lemmon Survey ||  || align=right | 2.5 km || 
|-id=261 bgcolor=#E9E9E9
| 536261 ||  || — || April 2, 2011 || Mount Lemmon || Mount Lemmon Survey ||  || align=right | 1.5 km || 
|-id=262 bgcolor=#fefefe
| 536262 ||  || — || February 15, 2015 || Haleakala || Pan-STARRS ||  || align=right data-sort-value="0.78" | 780 m || 
|-id=263 bgcolor=#d6d6d6
| 536263 ||  || — || August 20, 2006 || Kitt Peak || Spacewatch ||  || align=right | 3.2 km || 
|-id=264 bgcolor=#d6d6d6
| 536264 ||  || — || January 27, 2004 || Kitt Peak || Spacewatch ||  || align=right | 2.9 km || 
|-id=265 bgcolor=#E9E9E9
| 536265 ||  || — || January 26, 2010 || WISE || WISE ||  || align=right | 1.8 km || 
|-id=266 bgcolor=#E9E9E9
| 536266 ||  || — || October 10, 2005 || Catalina || CSS ||  || align=right | 1.1 km || 
|-id=267 bgcolor=#d6d6d6
| 536267 ||  || — || March 19, 2010 || Mount Lemmon || Mount Lemmon Survey ||  || align=right | 2.4 km || 
|-id=268 bgcolor=#fefefe
| 536268 ||  || — || January 27, 2011 || Kitt Peak || Spacewatch ||  || align=right data-sort-value="0.65" | 650 m || 
|-id=269 bgcolor=#E9E9E9
| 536269 ||  || — || November 26, 2014 || Haleakala || Pan-STARRS ||  || align=right | 1.6 km || 
|-id=270 bgcolor=#E9E9E9
| 536270 ||  || — || February 20, 2006 || Kitt Peak || Spacewatch ||  || align=right | 1.6 km || 
|-id=271 bgcolor=#fefefe
| 536271 ||  || — || September 24, 2013 || Mount Lemmon || Mount Lemmon Survey ||  || align=right data-sort-value="0.67" | 670 m || 
|-id=272 bgcolor=#fefefe
| 536272 ||  || — || February 24, 2011 || La Sagra || OAM Obs. ||  || align=right | 1.0 km || 
|-id=273 bgcolor=#d6d6d6
| 536273 ||  || — || February 9, 2010 || Kitt Peak || Spacewatch ||  || align=right | 2.3 km || 
|-id=274 bgcolor=#E9E9E9
| 536274 ||  || — || March 29, 2011 || Kitt Peak || Spacewatch ||  || align=right | 1.1 km || 
|-id=275 bgcolor=#E9E9E9
| 536275 ||  || — || April 26, 2011 || Mount Lemmon || Mount Lemmon Survey ||  || align=right | 1.3 km || 
|-id=276 bgcolor=#d6d6d6
| 536276 ||  || — || May 24, 1993 || Kitt Peak || Spacewatch ||  || align=right | 3.0 km || 
|-id=277 bgcolor=#E9E9E9
| 536277 ||  || — || February 14, 2010 || Mount Lemmon || Mount Lemmon Survey ||  || align=right | 1.9 km || 
|-id=278 bgcolor=#d6d6d6
| 536278 ||  || — || September 12, 2007 || Mount Lemmon || Mount Lemmon Survey ||  || align=right | 2.4 km || 
|-id=279 bgcolor=#E9E9E9
| 536279 ||  || — || January 29, 2010 || WISE || WISE ||  || align=right | 1.9 km || 
|-id=280 bgcolor=#d6d6d6
| 536280 ||  || — || November 21, 2008 || Kitt Peak || Spacewatch ||  || align=right | 2.2 km || 
|-id=281 bgcolor=#E9E9E9
| 536281 ||  || — || February 2, 2006 || Kitt Peak || Spacewatch ||  || align=right | 2.1 km || 
|-id=282 bgcolor=#E9E9E9
| 536282 ||  || — || February 16, 2010 || Mount Lemmon || Mount Lemmon Survey ||  || align=right | 3.5 km || 
|-id=283 bgcolor=#fefefe
| 536283 ||  || — || April 2, 2005 || Mount Lemmon || Mount Lemmon Survey ||  || align=right data-sort-value="0.71" | 710 m || 
|-id=284 bgcolor=#d6d6d6
| 536284 ||  || — || August 14, 2012 || Haleakala || Pan-STARRS ||  || align=right | 2.7 km || 
|-id=285 bgcolor=#fefefe
| 536285 ||  || — || December 13, 2006 || Kitt Peak || Spacewatch ||  || align=right data-sort-value="0.59" | 590 m || 
|-id=286 bgcolor=#E9E9E9
| 536286 ||  || — || March 12, 2010 || WISE || WISE ||  || align=right | 2.1 km || 
|-id=287 bgcolor=#C2E0FF
| 536287 ||  || — || January 30, 2011 || Haleakala || Pan-STARRS || other TNOcritical || align=right | 222 km || 
|-id=288 bgcolor=#E9E9E9
| 536288 ||  || — || February 12, 2015 || Haleakala || Pan-STARRS ||  || align=right | 1.3 km || 
|-id=289 bgcolor=#d6d6d6
| 536289 ||  || — || July 18, 2007 || Mount Lemmon || Mount Lemmon Survey ||  || align=right | 2.3 km || 
|-id=290 bgcolor=#E9E9E9
| 536290 ||  || — || October 5, 2013 || Haleakala || Pan-STARRS ||  || align=right | 1.1 km || 
|-id=291 bgcolor=#E9E9E9
| 536291 ||  || — || March 27, 2011 || Mount Lemmon || Mount Lemmon Survey ||  || align=right | 1.6 km || 
|-id=292 bgcolor=#fefefe
| 536292 ||  || — || October 3, 2006 || Mount Lemmon || Mount Lemmon Survey ||  || align=right data-sort-value="0.60" | 600 m || 
|-id=293 bgcolor=#d6d6d6
| 536293 ||  || — || November 30, 2008 || Mount Lemmon || Mount Lemmon Survey ||  || align=right | 1.9 km || 
|-id=294 bgcolor=#fefefe
| 536294 ||  || — || February 1, 2008 || Mount Lemmon || Mount Lemmon Survey ||  || align=right data-sort-value="0.87" | 870 m || 
|-id=295 bgcolor=#d6d6d6
| 536295 ||  || — || January 16, 2005 || Kitt Peak || Spacewatch ||  || align=right | 2.1 km || 
|-id=296 bgcolor=#E9E9E9
| 536296 ||  || — || January 31, 2006 || Mount Lemmon || Mount Lemmon Survey ||  || align=right | 1.6 km || 
|-id=297 bgcolor=#fefefe
| 536297 ||  || — || January 20, 2015 || Haleakala || Pan-STARRS ||  || align=right data-sort-value="0.61" | 610 m || 
|-id=298 bgcolor=#E9E9E9
| 536298 ||  || — || November 26, 2014 || Haleakala || Pan-STARRS ||  || align=right | 2.5 km || 
|-id=299 bgcolor=#d6d6d6
| 536299 ||  || — || October 28, 2008 || Kitt Peak || Spacewatch ||  || align=right | 2.8 km || 
|-id=300 bgcolor=#d6d6d6
| 536300 ||  || — || August 26, 2012 || Mount Lemmon || Mount Lemmon Survey ||  || align=right | 2.5 km || 
|}

536301–536400 

|-bgcolor=#E9E9E9
| 536301 ||  || — || September 4, 1999 || Kitt Peak || Spacewatch ||  || align=right | 1.2 km || 
|-id=302 bgcolor=#d6d6d6
| 536302 ||  || — || March 3, 2009 || Mount Lemmon || Mount Lemmon Survey ||  || align=right | 2.8 km || 
|-id=303 bgcolor=#d6d6d6
| 536303 ||  || — || February 10, 2015 || Mount Lemmon || Mount Lemmon Survey ||  || align=right | 2.4 km || 
|-id=304 bgcolor=#d6d6d6
| 536304 ||  || — || September 12, 2007 || Mount Lemmon || Mount Lemmon Survey ||  || align=right | 3.9 km || 
|-id=305 bgcolor=#d6d6d6
| 536305 ||  || — || October 10, 2008 || Mount Lemmon || Mount Lemmon Survey ||  || align=right | 2.0 km || 
|-id=306 bgcolor=#E9E9E9
| 536306 ||  || — || September 29, 2009 || Mount Lemmon || Mount Lemmon Survey ||  || align=right | 3.2 km || 
|-id=307 bgcolor=#E9E9E9
| 536307 ||  || — || January 24, 2015 || Haleakala || Pan-STARRS ||  || align=right | 1.4 km || 
|-id=308 bgcolor=#d6d6d6
| 536308 ||  || — || September 24, 2008 || Mount Lemmon || Mount Lemmon Survey ||  || align=right | 2.2 km || 
|-id=309 bgcolor=#E9E9E9
| 536309 ||  || — || September 28, 2003 || Kitt Peak || Spacewatch ||  || align=right | 2.4 km || 
|-id=310 bgcolor=#E9E9E9
| 536310 ||  || — || January 20, 2015 || Haleakala || Pan-STARRS ||  || align=right data-sort-value="0.82" | 820 m || 
|-id=311 bgcolor=#E9E9E9
| 536311 ||  || — || January 27, 2015 || Haleakala || Pan-STARRS ||  || align=right | 1.4 km || 
|-id=312 bgcolor=#d6d6d6
| 536312 ||  || — || December 3, 2013 || Haleakala || Pan-STARRS ||  || align=right | 1.9 km || 
|-id=313 bgcolor=#E9E9E9
| 536313 ||  || — || February 26, 2011 || Kitt Peak || Spacewatch ||  || align=right data-sort-value="0.71" | 710 m || 
|-id=314 bgcolor=#E9E9E9
| 536314 ||  || — || February 11, 2015 || Kitt Peak || Spacewatch ||  || align=right | 1.00 km || 
|-id=315 bgcolor=#fefefe
| 536315 ||  || — || November 4, 2013 || Mount Lemmon || Mount Lemmon Survey ||  || align=right data-sort-value="0.74" | 740 m || 
|-id=316 bgcolor=#d6d6d6
| 536316 ||  || — || January 25, 2015 || Haleakala || Pan-STARRS ||  || align=right | 2.4 km || 
|-id=317 bgcolor=#d6d6d6
| 536317 ||  || — || April 13, 2010 || WISE || WISE ||  || align=right | 1.8 km || 
|-id=318 bgcolor=#d6d6d6
| 536318 ||  || — || January 20, 2015 || Mount Lemmon || Mount Lemmon Survey ||  || align=right | 2.8 km || 
|-id=319 bgcolor=#E9E9E9
| 536319 ||  || — || December 27, 2005 || Kitt Peak || Spacewatch ||  || align=right | 1.8 km || 
|-id=320 bgcolor=#E9E9E9
| 536320 ||  || — || February 13, 2015 || XuYi || PMO NEO ||  || align=right | 1.7 km || 
|-id=321 bgcolor=#d6d6d6
| 536321 ||  || — || November 27, 2013 || Haleakala || Pan-STARRS ||  || align=right | 2.2 km || 
|-id=322 bgcolor=#fefefe
| 536322 ||  || — || February 2, 2008 || Kitt Peak || Spacewatch ||  || align=right data-sort-value="0.66" | 660 m || 
|-id=323 bgcolor=#fefefe
| 536323 ||  || — || November 6, 2010 || Mount Lemmon || Mount Lemmon Survey ||  || align=right data-sort-value="0.57" | 570 m || 
|-id=324 bgcolor=#d6d6d6
| 536324 ||  || — || January 11, 2010 || Kitt Peak || Spacewatch ||  || align=right | 3.0 km || 
|-id=325 bgcolor=#fefefe
| 536325 ||  || — || April 15, 2008 || Kitt Peak || Spacewatch ||  || align=right data-sort-value="0.67" | 670 m || 
|-id=326 bgcolor=#d6d6d6
| 536326 ||  || — || October 3, 2013 || Haleakala || Pan-STARRS ||  || align=right | 2.4 km || 
|-id=327 bgcolor=#E9E9E9
| 536327 ||  || — || December 25, 2005 || Kitt Peak || Spacewatch ||  || align=right | 1.0 km || 
|-id=328 bgcolor=#d6d6d6
| 536328 ||  || — || June 7, 2011 || Mount Lemmon || Mount Lemmon Survey ||  || align=right | 3.4 km || 
|-id=329 bgcolor=#fefefe
| 536329 ||  || — || January 18, 2015 || Haleakala || Pan-STARRS ||  || align=right data-sort-value="0.67" | 670 m || 
|-id=330 bgcolor=#d6d6d6
| 536330 ||  || — || December 20, 2004 || Mount Lemmon || Mount Lemmon Survey ||  || align=right | 2.6 km || 
|-id=331 bgcolor=#E9E9E9
| 536331 ||  || — || September 6, 2008 || Catalina || CSS ||  || align=right | 2.0 km || 
|-id=332 bgcolor=#d6d6d6
| 536332 ||  || — || June 6, 2011 || Haleakala || Pan-STARRS ||  || align=right | 3.0 km || 
|-id=333 bgcolor=#E9E9E9
| 536333 ||  || — || April 6, 2011 || Mount Lemmon || Mount Lemmon Survey ||  || align=right | 2.1 km || 
|-id=334 bgcolor=#d6d6d6
| 536334 ||  || — || September 14, 2007 || Mount Lemmon || Mount Lemmon Survey ||  || align=right | 2.3 km || 
|-id=335 bgcolor=#d6d6d6
| 536335 ||  || — || October 8, 2007 || Kitt Peak || Spacewatch ||  || align=right | 2.5 km || 
|-id=336 bgcolor=#fefefe
| 536336 ||  || — || October 3, 2013 || Mount Lemmon || Mount Lemmon Survey ||  || align=right data-sort-value="0.60" | 600 m || 
|-id=337 bgcolor=#d6d6d6
| 536337 ||  || — || January 7, 2010 || Kitt Peak || Spacewatch ||  || align=right | 1.7 km || 
|-id=338 bgcolor=#E9E9E9
| 536338 ||  || — || January 8, 2011 || Mount Lemmon || Mount Lemmon Survey ||  || align=right data-sort-value="0.86" | 860 m || 
|-id=339 bgcolor=#E9E9E9
| 536339 ||  || — || August 22, 1995 || Kitt Peak || Spacewatch ||  || align=right | 2.1 km || 
|-id=340 bgcolor=#E9E9E9
| 536340 ||  || — || December 30, 2005 || Mount Lemmon || Mount Lemmon Survey ||  || align=right | 1.4 km || 
|-id=341 bgcolor=#E9E9E9
| 536341 ||  || — || August 17, 2012 || Haleakala || Pan-STARRS ||  || align=right data-sort-value="0.81" | 810 m || 
|-id=342 bgcolor=#d6d6d6
| 536342 ||  || — || January 24, 2015 || Mount Lemmon || Mount Lemmon Survey ||  || align=right | 2.5 km || 
|-id=343 bgcolor=#E9E9E9
| 536343 ||  || — || January 24, 2015 || Mount Lemmon || Mount Lemmon Survey ||  || align=right data-sort-value="0.79" | 790 m || 
|-id=344 bgcolor=#E9E9E9
| 536344 ||  || — || October 14, 2013 || Mount Lemmon || Mount Lemmon Survey ||  || align=right | 1.2 km || 
|-id=345 bgcolor=#fefefe
| 536345 ||  || — || August 14, 2013 || Haleakala || Pan-STARRS ||  || align=right data-sort-value="0.97" | 970 m || 
|-id=346 bgcolor=#d6d6d6
| 536346 ||  || — || September 12, 2007 || Mount Lemmon || Mount Lemmon Survey ||  || align=right | 3.1 km || 
|-id=347 bgcolor=#fefefe
| 536347 ||  || — || January 29, 2011 || Catalina || CSS ||  || align=right | 1.2 km || 
|-id=348 bgcolor=#E9E9E9
| 536348 ||  || — || January 27, 2015 || Haleakala || Pan-STARRS ||  || align=right | 1.2 km || 
|-id=349 bgcolor=#E9E9E9
| 536349 ||  || — || February 23, 2011 || Kitt Peak || Spacewatch ||  || align=right | 1.2 km || 
|-id=350 bgcolor=#E9E9E9
| 536350 ||  || — || February 14, 2010 || Mount Lemmon || Mount Lemmon Survey ||  || align=right | 2.1 km || 
|-id=351 bgcolor=#d6d6d6
| 536351 ||  || — || November 7, 2008 || Mount Lemmon || Mount Lemmon Survey ||  || align=right | 1.9 km || 
|-id=352 bgcolor=#E9E9E9
| 536352 ||  || — || March 13, 2011 || Mount Lemmon || Mount Lemmon Survey ||  || align=right data-sort-value="0.86" | 860 m || 
|-id=353 bgcolor=#fefefe
| 536353 ||  || — || January 30, 2011 || Mount Lemmon || Mount Lemmon Survey ||  || align=right data-sort-value="0.92" | 920 m || 
|-id=354 bgcolor=#d6d6d6
| 536354 ||  || — || August 17, 2012 || Haleakala || Pan-STARRS ||  || align=right | 2.0 km || 
|-id=355 bgcolor=#E9E9E9
| 536355 ||  || — || January 28, 2011 || Kitt Peak || Spacewatch ||  || align=right data-sort-value="0.96" | 960 m || 
|-id=356 bgcolor=#E9E9E9
| 536356 ||  || — || January 31, 2006 || Kitt Peak || Spacewatch ||  || align=right | 1.4 km || 
|-id=357 bgcolor=#fefefe
| 536357 ||  || — || September 17, 2006 || Kitt Peak || Spacewatch ||  || align=right data-sort-value="0.73" | 730 m || 
|-id=358 bgcolor=#E9E9E9
| 536358 ||  || — || January 21, 2015 || Haleakala || Pan-STARRS ||  || align=right | 2.2 km || 
|-id=359 bgcolor=#E9E9E9
| 536359 ||  || — || November 30, 2005 || Kitt Peak || Spacewatch ||  || align=right | 1.2 km || 
|-id=360 bgcolor=#E9E9E9
| 536360 ||  || — || January 27, 2015 || Haleakala || Pan-STARRS ||  || align=right data-sort-value="0.92" | 920 m || 
|-id=361 bgcolor=#E9E9E9
| 536361 ||  || — || October 29, 2008 || Kitt Peak || Spacewatch ||  || align=right | 1.7 km || 
|-id=362 bgcolor=#fefefe
| 536362 ||  || — || May 9, 2004 || Kitt Peak || Spacewatch ||  || align=right data-sort-value="0.98" | 980 m || 
|-id=363 bgcolor=#d6d6d6
| 536363 ||  || — || November 20, 2003 || Catalina || CSS ||  || align=right | 2.6 km || 
|-id=364 bgcolor=#d6d6d6
| 536364 ||  || — || January 30, 2009 || Kitt Peak || Spacewatch ||  || align=right | 2.9 km || 
|-id=365 bgcolor=#fefefe
| 536365 ||  || — || January 30, 2011 || Mount Lemmon || Mount Lemmon Survey ||  || align=right data-sort-value="0.63" | 630 m || 
|-id=366 bgcolor=#E9E9E9
| 536366 ||  || — || March 25, 2011 || Kitt Peak || Spacewatch ||  || align=right | 1.1 km || 
|-id=367 bgcolor=#E9E9E9
| 536367 ||  || — || January 28, 2006 || Kitt Peak || Spacewatch ||  || align=right | 1.9 km || 
|-id=368 bgcolor=#E9E9E9
| 536368 ||  || — || November 9, 2013 || Kitt Peak || Spacewatch ||  || align=right | 1.8 km || 
|-id=369 bgcolor=#fefefe
| 536369 ||  || — || May 14, 2008 || Mount Lemmon || Mount Lemmon Survey ||  || align=right data-sort-value="0.78" | 780 m || 
|-id=370 bgcolor=#d6d6d6
| 536370 ||  || — || September 19, 2012 || Mount Lemmon || Mount Lemmon Survey ||  || align=right | 2.5 km || 
|-id=371 bgcolor=#d6d6d6
| 536371 ||  || — || May 2, 2000 || Kitt Peak || Spacewatch ||  || align=right | 2.9 km || 
|-id=372 bgcolor=#fefefe
| 536372 ||  || — || October 22, 2006 || Kitt Peak || Spacewatch ||  || align=right data-sort-value="0.60" | 600 m || 
|-id=373 bgcolor=#E9E9E9
| 536373 ||  || — || November 19, 2004 || Socorro || LINEAR ||  || align=right | 1.9 km || 
|-id=374 bgcolor=#d6d6d6
| 536374 ||  || — || January 6, 2010 || Kitt Peak || Spacewatch ||  || align=right | 1.7 km || 
|-id=375 bgcolor=#E9E9E9
| 536375 ||  || — || February 23, 2007 || Kitt Peak || Spacewatch ||  || align=right data-sort-value="0.73" | 730 m || 
|-id=376 bgcolor=#d6d6d6
| 536376 ||  || — || January 27, 2004 || Kitt Peak || Spacewatch ||  || align=right | 2.4 km || 
|-id=377 bgcolor=#E9E9E9
| 536377 ||  || — || January 20, 2015 || Haleakala || Pan-STARRS ||  || align=right data-sort-value="0.88" | 880 m || 
|-id=378 bgcolor=#d6d6d6
| 536378 ||  || — || January 16, 2004 || Kitt Peak || Spacewatch ||  || align=right | 2.9 km || 
|-id=379 bgcolor=#fefefe
| 536379 ||  || — || January 29, 2011 || Mount Lemmon || Mount Lemmon Survey ||  || align=right data-sort-value="0.69" | 690 m || 
|-id=380 bgcolor=#d6d6d6
| 536380 ||  || — || March 14, 2010 || Mount Lemmon || Mount Lemmon Survey ||  || align=right | 2.7 km || 
|-id=381 bgcolor=#d6d6d6
| 536381 ||  || — || January 18, 2009 || Kitt Peak || Spacewatch ||  || align=right | 2.8 km || 
|-id=382 bgcolor=#E9E9E9
| 536382 ||  || — || February 8, 2011 || Mount Lemmon || Mount Lemmon Survey ||  || align=right data-sort-value="0.73" | 730 m || 
|-id=383 bgcolor=#d6d6d6
| 536383 ||  || — || September 18, 2006 || Kitt Peak || Spacewatch ||  || align=right | 2.8 km || 
|-id=384 bgcolor=#fefefe
| 536384 ||  || — || April 27, 2012 || Mount Lemmon || Mount Lemmon Survey ||  || align=right data-sort-value="0.71" | 710 m || 
|-id=385 bgcolor=#E9E9E9
| 536385 ||  || — || November 29, 2005 || Kitt Peak || Spacewatch ||  || align=right | 1.9 km || 
|-id=386 bgcolor=#fefefe
| 536386 ||  || — || January 30, 2011 || Haleakala || Pan-STARRS ||  || align=right data-sort-value="0.90" | 900 m || 
|-id=387 bgcolor=#fefefe
| 536387 ||  || — || December 6, 2010 || Kitt Peak || Spacewatch ||  || align=right data-sort-value="0.53" | 530 m || 
|-id=388 bgcolor=#E9E9E9
| 536388 ||  || — || March 10, 2007 || Kitt Peak || Spacewatch ||  || align=right data-sort-value="0.88" | 880 m || 
|-id=389 bgcolor=#fefefe
| 536389 ||  || — || September 16, 2006 || Anderson Mesa || LONEOS ||  || align=right data-sort-value="0.75" | 750 m || 
|-id=390 bgcolor=#E9E9E9
| 536390 ||  || — || October 25, 2013 || Mount Lemmon || Mount Lemmon Survey ||  || align=right | 1.2 km || 
|-id=391 bgcolor=#E9E9E9
| 536391 ||  || — || February 10, 1996 || Kitt Peak || Spacewatch ||  || align=right | 1.7 km || 
|-id=392 bgcolor=#d6d6d6
| 536392 ||  || — || January 26, 2009 || Mount Lemmon || Mount Lemmon Survey ||  || align=right | 2.4 km || 
|-id=393 bgcolor=#d6d6d6
| 536393 ||  || — || August 15, 2002 || Kitt Peak || Spacewatch ||  || align=right | 2.6 km || 
|-id=394 bgcolor=#E9E9E9
| 536394 ||  || — || January 20, 2015 || Haleakala || Pan-STARRS ||  || align=right | 1.4 km || 
|-id=395 bgcolor=#d6d6d6
| 536395 ||  || — || March 13, 2010 || Mount Lemmon || Mount Lemmon Survey ||  || align=right | 2.7 km || 
|-id=396 bgcolor=#E9E9E9
| 536396 ||  || — || January 29, 2015 || Haleakala || Pan-STARRS ||  || align=right | 1.3 km || 
|-id=397 bgcolor=#E9E9E9
| 536397 ||  || — || November 20, 2009 || Mount Lemmon || Mount Lemmon Survey ||  || align=right data-sort-value="0.89" | 890 m || 
|-id=398 bgcolor=#E9E9E9
| 536398 ||  || — || November 19, 2009 || Mount Lemmon || Mount Lemmon Survey ||  || align=right | 1.6 km || 
|-id=399 bgcolor=#E9E9E9
| 536399 ||  || — || October 23, 2008 || Kitt Peak || Spacewatch ||  || align=right | 1.7 km || 
|-id=400 bgcolor=#d6d6d6
| 536400 ||  || — || January 18, 2010 || WISE || WISE ||  || align=right | 2.1 km || 
|}

536401–536500 

|-bgcolor=#d6d6d6
| 536401 ||  || — || February 14, 2010 || Catalina || CSS ||  || align=right | 3.7 km || 
|-id=402 bgcolor=#fefefe
| 536402 ||  || — || November 3, 2010 || Mount Lemmon || Mount Lemmon Survey ||  || align=right data-sort-value="0.63" | 630 m || 
|-id=403 bgcolor=#d6d6d6
| 536403 ||  || — || March 12, 2010 || Catalina || CSS ||  || align=right | 2.3 km || 
|-id=404 bgcolor=#fefefe
| 536404 ||  || — || January 31, 2008 || Catalina || CSS ||  || align=right data-sort-value="0.74" | 740 m || 
|-id=405 bgcolor=#d6d6d6
| 536405 ||  || — || October 31, 2013 || Kitt Peak || Spacewatch ||  || align=right | 3.1 km || 
|-id=406 bgcolor=#d6d6d6
| 536406 ||  || — || April 26, 2010 || WISE || WISE || NAE || align=right | 3.3 km || 
|-id=407 bgcolor=#E9E9E9
| 536407 ||  || — || April 28, 2011 || Haleakala || Pan-STARRS ||  || align=right | 2.3 km || 
|-id=408 bgcolor=#d6d6d6
| 536408 ||  || — || April 10, 2005 || Mount Lemmon || Mount Lemmon Survey ||  || align=right | 3.5 km || 
|-id=409 bgcolor=#E9E9E9
| 536409 ||  || — || May 9, 2007 || Kitt Peak || Spacewatch ||  || align=right | 3.2 km || 
|-id=410 bgcolor=#E9E9E9
| 536410 ||  || — || September 15, 2004 || Kitt Peak || Spacewatch ||  || align=right | 2.2 km || 
|-id=411 bgcolor=#d6d6d6
| 536411 ||  || — || March 4, 2005 || Mount Lemmon || Mount Lemmon Survey ||  || align=right | 2.8 km || 
|-id=412 bgcolor=#d6d6d6
| 536412 ||  || — || December 31, 2008 || Mount Lemmon || Mount Lemmon Survey || EOS || align=right | 2.2 km || 
|-id=413 bgcolor=#d6d6d6
| 536413 ||  || — || March 16, 2010 || Mount Lemmon || Mount Lemmon Survey || EOS || align=right | 1.7 km || 
|-id=414 bgcolor=#E9E9E9
| 536414 ||  || — || February 22, 2006 || Anderson Mesa || LONEOS || GEF || align=right | 1.4 km || 
|-id=415 bgcolor=#d6d6d6
| 536415 ||  || — || September 15, 2007 || Kitt Peak || Spacewatch ||  || align=right | 2.6 km || 
|-id=416 bgcolor=#E9E9E9
| 536416 ||  || — || December 24, 2005 || Kitt Peak || Spacewatch || JUN || align=right | 1.2 km || 
|-id=417 bgcolor=#E9E9E9
| 536417 ||  || — || October 31, 2005 || Kitt Peak || Spacewatch ||  || align=right | 1.4 km || 
|-id=418 bgcolor=#d6d6d6
| 536418 ||  || — || October 25, 2013 || Kitt Peak || Spacewatch ||  || align=right | 2.7 km || 
|-id=419 bgcolor=#d6d6d6
| 536419 ||  || — || January 20, 2009 || Catalina || CSS ||  || align=right | 4.3 km || 
|-id=420 bgcolor=#E9E9E9
| 536420 ||  || — || November 25, 2005 || Mount Lemmon || Mount Lemmon Survey || EUN || align=right | 1.0 km || 
|-id=421 bgcolor=#E9E9E9
| 536421 ||  || — || September 27, 2009 || Mount Lemmon || Mount Lemmon Survey ||  || align=right | 1.4 km || 
|-id=422 bgcolor=#d6d6d6
| 536422 ||  || — || March 16, 2010 || Mount Lemmon || Mount Lemmon Survey || EOS || align=right | 1.8 km || 
|-id=423 bgcolor=#fefefe
| 536423 ||  || — || April 12, 2004 || Kitt Peak || Spacewatch ||  || align=right data-sort-value="0.73" | 730 m || 
|-id=424 bgcolor=#E9E9E9
| 536424 ||  || — || May 8, 2011 || Mount Lemmon || Mount Lemmon Survey ||  || align=right | 2.4 km || 
|-id=425 bgcolor=#E9E9E9
| 536425 ||  || — || October 9, 2013 || Mount Lemmon || Mount Lemmon Survey ||  || align=right | 1.3 km || 
|-id=426 bgcolor=#fefefe
| 536426 ||  || — || April 15, 2012 || Haleakala || Pan-STARRS ||  || align=right data-sort-value="0.65" | 650 m || 
|-id=427 bgcolor=#E9E9E9
| 536427 ||  || — || March 13, 2011 || Mount Lemmon || Mount Lemmon Survey ||  || align=right | 1.6 km || 
|-id=428 bgcolor=#fefefe
| 536428 ||  || — || January 10, 2011 || Mount Lemmon || Mount Lemmon Survey ||  || align=right data-sort-value="0.57" | 570 m || 
|-id=429 bgcolor=#E9E9E9
| 536429 ||  || — || November 19, 2009 || Mount Lemmon || Mount Lemmon Survey ||  || align=right data-sort-value="0.91" | 910 m || 
|-id=430 bgcolor=#E9E9E9
| 536430 ||  || — || September 29, 2008 || Kitt Peak || Spacewatch || HOF || align=right | 2.1 km || 
|-id=431 bgcolor=#E9E9E9
| 536431 ||  || — || February 17, 2015 || Haleakala || Pan-STARRS ||  || align=right | 1.4 km || 
|-id=432 bgcolor=#d6d6d6
| 536432 ||  || — || January 21, 2015 || Haleakala || Pan-STARRS ||  || align=right | 2.8 km || 
|-id=433 bgcolor=#fefefe
| 536433 ||  || — || December 5, 2002 || Socorro || LINEAR || V || align=right data-sort-value="0.89" | 890 m || 
|-id=434 bgcolor=#d6d6d6
| 536434 ||  || — || October 7, 2013 || Mount Lemmon || Mount Lemmon Survey ||  || align=right | 2.9 km || 
|-id=435 bgcolor=#E9E9E9
| 536435 ||  || — || March 29, 2011 || Catalina || CSS ||  || align=right data-sort-value="0.78" | 780 m || 
|-id=436 bgcolor=#fefefe
| 536436 ||  || — || January 11, 2011 || Kitt Peak || Spacewatch ||  || align=right data-sort-value="0.77" | 770 m || 
|-id=437 bgcolor=#d6d6d6
| 536437 ||  || — || October 9, 2007 || Kitt Peak || Spacewatch ||  || align=right | 3.2 km || 
|-id=438 bgcolor=#d6d6d6
| 536438 ||  || — || December 25, 2013 || Mount Lemmon || Mount Lemmon Survey ||  || align=right | 3.1 km || 
|-id=439 bgcolor=#d6d6d6
| 536439 ||  || — || January 17, 2009 || Kitt Peak || Spacewatch ||  || align=right | 2.8 km || 
|-id=440 bgcolor=#E9E9E9
| 536440 ||  || — || January 8, 2006 || Mount Lemmon || Mount Lemmon Survey || EUN || align=right | 1.1 km || 
|-id=441 bgcolor=#d6d6d6
| 536441 ||  || — || January 19, 2015 || Haleakala || Pan-STARRS ||  || align=right | 2.8 km || 
|-id=442 bgcolor=#d6d6d6
| 536442 ||  || — || December 29, 2014 || Haleakala || Pan-STARRS ||  || align=right | 2.6 km || 
|-id=443 bgcolor=#E9E9E9
| 536443 ||  || — || March 11, 2011 || Catalina || CSS ||  || align=right | 1.2 km || 
|-id=444 bgcolor=#d6d6d6
| 536444 ||  || — || October 10, 2007 || Mount Lemmon || Mount Lemmon Survey ||  || align=right | 3.3 km || 
|-id=445 bgcolor=#E9E9E9
| 536445 ||  || — || December 10, 2004 || Socorro || LINEAR ||  || align=right | 2.9 km || 
|-id=446 bgcolor=#E9E9E9
| 536446 ||  || — || December 7, 2013 || Haleakala || Pan-STARRS ||  || align=right | 2.1 km || 
|-id=447 bgcolor=#d6d6d6
| 536447 ||  || — || March 4, 2010 || WISE || WISE ||  || align=right | 3.0 km || 
|-id=448 bgcolor=#E9E9E9
| 536448 ||  || — || October 2, 2013 || Haleakala || Pan-STARRS ||  || align=right data-sort-value="0.86" | 860 m || 
|-id=449 bgcolor=#E9E9E9
| 536449 ||  || — || April 24, 2011 || Kitt Peak || Spacewatch ||  || align=right data-sort-value="0.80" | 800 m || 
|-id=450 bgcolor=#d6d6d6
| 536450 ||  || — || January 1, 2014 || Haleakala || Pan-STARRS ||  || align=right | 2.8 km || 
|-id=451 bgcolor=#E9E9E9
| 536451 ||  || — || December 30, 2005 || Socorro || LINEAR ||  || align=right | 1.6 km || 
|-id=452 bgcolor=#d6d6d6
| 536452 ||  || — || January 30, 2009 || Catalina || CSS ||  || align=right | 2.8 km || 
|-id=453 bgcolor=#d6d6d6
| 536453 ||  || — || December 13, 2013 || Mount Lemmon || Mount Lemmon Survey ||  || align=right | 3.4 km || 
|-id=454 bgcolor=#d6d6d6
| 536454 ||  || — || October 9, 2008 || Mount Lemmon || Mount Lemmon Survey ||  || align=right | 3.0 km || 
|-id=455 bgcolor=#E9E9E9
| 536455 ||  || — || February 17, 2015 || Haleakala || Pan-STARRS ||  || align=right data-sort-value="0.86" | 860 m || 
|-id=456 bgcolor=#E9E9E9
| 536456 ||  || — || March 20, 2010 || WISE || WISE ||  || align=right data-sort-value="0.92" | 920 m || 
|-id=457 bgcolor=#d6d6d6
| 536457 ||  || — || February 17, 2015 || Haleakala || Pan-STARRS ||  || align=right | 4.4 km || 
|-id=458 bgcolor=#d6d6d6
| 536458 ||  || — || April 8, 2010 || Catalina || CSS ||  || align=right | 3.4 km || 
|-id=459 bgcolor=#E9E9E9
| 536459 ||  || — || September 21, 2009 || Mount Lemmon || Mount Lemmon Survey ||  || align=right | 1.3 km || 
|-id=460 bgcolor=#E9E9E9
| 536460 ||  || — || December 5, 2010 || Mount Lemmon || Mount Lemmon Survey ||  || align=right | 1.1 km || 
|-id=461 bgcolor=#fefefe
| 536461 ||  || — || July 16, 2013 || Haleakala || Pan-STARRS ||  || align=right data-sort-value="0.75" | 750 m || 
|-id=462 bgcolor=#d6d6d6
| 536462 ||  || — || November 29, 2014 || Haleakala || Pan-STARRS ||  || align=right | 3.2 km || 
|-id=463 bgcolor=#E9E9E9
| 536463 ||  || — || March 10, 2007 || Kitt Peak || Spacewatch ||  || align=right data-sort-value="0.69" | 690 m || 
|-id=464 bgcolor=#E9E9E9
| 536464 ||  || — || February 27, 2006 || Kitt Peak || Spacewatch ||  || align=right | 2.2 km || 
|-id=465 bgcolor=#E9E9E9
| 536465 ||  || — || February 10, 2007 || Catalina || CSS ||  || align=right | 1.2 km || 
|-id=466 bgcolor=#d6d6d6
| 536466 ||  || — || November 3, 2004 || Kitt Peak || Spacewatch ||  || align=right | 2.4 km || 
|-id=467 bgcolor=#fefefe
| 536467 ||  || — || May 16, 2012 || Kitt Peak || Spacewatch ||  || align=right data-sort-value="0.71" | 710 m || 
|-id=468 bgcolor=#E9E9E9
| 536468 ||  || — || January 30, 2006 || Kitt Peak || Spacewatch ||  || align=right | 2.5 km || 
|-id=469 bgcolor=#E9E9E9
| 536469 ||  || — || December 27, 2005 || Kitt Peak || Spacewatch ||  || align=right | 2.0 km || 
|-id=470 bgcolor=#fefefe
| 536470 ||  || — || October 31, 2006 || Kitt Peak || Spacewatch ||  || align=right data-sort-value="0.68" | 680 m || 
|-id=471 bgcolor=#d6d6d6
| 536471 ||  || — || October 29, 2008 || Kitt Peak || Spacewatch || EOS || align=right | 1.6 km || 
|-id=472 bgcolor=#E9E9E9
| 536472 ||  || — || November 4, 2005 || Mount Lemmon || Mount Lemmon Survey ||  || align=right data-sort-value="0.86" | 860 m || 
|-id=473 bgcolor=#E9E9E9
| 536473 ||  || — || July 3, 1998 || Kitt Peak || Spacewatch ||  || align=right | 2.7 km || 
|-id=474 bgcolor=#E9E9E9
| 536474 ||  || — || March 9, 2011 || Kitt Peak || Spacewatch ||  || align=right | 1.7 km || 
|-id=475 bgcolor=#E9E9E9
| 536475 ||  || — || October 16, 2009 || Catalina || CSS ||  || align=right | 1.6 km || 
|-id=476 bgcolor=#fefefe
| 536476 ||  || — || October 26, 2013 || Mount Lemmon || Mount Lemmon Survey ||  || align=right | 1.0 km || 
|-id=477 bgcolor=#d6d6d6
| 536477 ||  || — || March 17, 2004 || Kitt Peak || Spacewatch || (5651) || align=right | 5.3 km || 
|-id=478 bgcolor=#E9E9E9
| 536478 ||  || — || April 6, 2011 || Mount Lemmon || Mount Lemmon Survey ||  || align=right | 2.2 km || 
|-id=479 bgcolor=#d6d6d6
| 536479 ||  || — || November 28, 2013 || Mount Lemmon || Mount Lemmon Survey || EOS || align=right | 2.0 km || 
|-id=480 bgcolor=#E9E9E9
| 536480 ||  || — || April 10, 2010 || WISE || WISE ||  || align=right | 1.9 km || 
|-id=481 bgcolor=#E9E9E9
| 536481 ||  || — || March 12, 2011 || Mount Lemmon || Mount Lemmon Survey ||  || align=right | 1.0 km || 
|-id=482 bgcolor=#d6d6d6
| 536482 ||  || — || October 11, 2012 || Mount Lemmon || Mount Lemmon Survey ||  || align=right | 3.0 km || 
|-id=483 bgcolor=#E9E9E9
| 536483 ||  || — || May 8, 2010 || WISE || WISE || HOF || align=right | 3.7 km || 
|-id=484 bgcolor=#E9E9E9
| 536484 ||  || — || June 8, 2007 || Kitt Peak || Spacewatch || MAR || align=right | 1.0 km || 
|-id=485 bgcolor=#E9E9E9
| 536485 ||  || — || January 27, 2015 || Haleakala || Pan-STARRS ||  || align=right | 1.5 km || 
|-id=486 bgcolor=#d6d6d6
| 536486 ||  || — || November 11, 2013 || Kitt Peak || Spacewatch ||  || align=right | 2.8 km || 
|-id=487 bgcolor=#d6d6d6
| 536487 ||  || — || March 16, 2004 || Kitt Peak || Spacewatch ||  || align=right | 2.9 km || 
|-id=488 bgcolor=#d6d6d6
| 536488 ||  || — || October 8, 2007 || Anderson Mesa || LONEOS || EOS || align=right | 1.9 km || 
|-id=489 bgcolor=#d6d6d6
| 536489 ||  || — || February 9, 2005 || Mount Lemmon || Mount Lemmon Survey || KOR || align=right | 1.5 km || 
|-id=490 bgcolor=#E9E9E9
| 536490 ||  || — || May 16, 2007 || Kitt Peak || Spacewatch ||  || align=right data-sort-value="0.85" | 850 m || 
|-id=491 bgcolor=#E9E9E9
| 536491 ||  || — || February 27, 2006 || Kitt Peak || Spacewatch ||  || align=right | 1.7 km || 
|-id=492 bgcolor=#d6d6d6
| 536492 ||  || — || June 9, 2010 || WISE || WISE ||  || align=right | 3.5 km || 
|-id=493 bgcolor=#E9E9E9
| 536493 ||  || — || November 28, 2014 || Haleakala || Pan-STARRS ||  || align=right | 1.0 km || 
|-id=494 bgcolor=#d6d6d6
| 536494 ||  || — || June 22, 2010 || WISE || WISE ||  || align=right | 3.5 km || 
|-id=495 bgcolor=#E9E9E9
| 536495 ||  || — || October 23, 2008 || Kitt Peak || Spacewatch ||  || align=right | 2.2 km || 
|-id=496 bgcolor=#d6d6d6
| 536496 ||  || — || January 20, 2015 || Haleakala || Pan-STARRS ||  || align=right | 2.5 km || 
|-id=497 bgcolor=#d6d6d6
| 536497 ||  || — || August 26, 2013 || Haleakala || Pan-STARRS ||  || align=right | 2.4 km || 
|-id=498 bgcolor=#d6d6d6
| 536498 ||  || — || September 11, 2007 || Kitt Peak || Spacewatch ||  || align=right | 2.8 km || 
|-id=499 bgcolor=#E9E9E9
| 536499 ||  || — || November 10, 2009 || Kitt Peak || Spacewatch ||  || align=right | 1.4 km || 
|-id=500 bgcolor=#E9E9E9
| 536500 ||  || — || March 9, 2011 || Mount Lemmon || Mount Lemmon Survey ||  || align=right data-sort-value="0.71" | 710 m || 
|}

536501–536600 

|-bgcolor=#d6d6d6
| 536501 ||  || — || September 11, 2007 || Mount Lemmon || Mount Lemmon Survey ||  || align=right | 2.9 km || 
|-id=502 bgcolor=#d6d6d6
| 536502 ||  || — || October 10, 2007 || Mount Lemmon || Mount Lemmon Survey ||  || align=right | 2.7 km || 
|-id=503 bgcolor=#E9E9E9
| 536503 ||  || — || February 20, 2015 || Haleakala || Pan-STARRS ||  || align=right | 3.0 km || 
|-id=504 bgcolor=#E9E9E9
| 536504 ||  || — || October 1, 2005 || Mount Lemmon || Mount Lemmon Survey ||  || align=right | 3.2 km || 
|-id=505 bgcolor=#E9E9E9
| 536505 ||  || — || May 16, 2012 || Mount Lemmon || Mount Lemmon Survey ||  || align=right | 1.8 km || 
|-id=506 bgcolor=#E9E9E9
| 536506 ||  || — || September 27, 2009 || Mount Lemmon || Mount Lemmon Survey || JUN || align=right data-sort-value="0.83" | 830 m || 
|-id=507 bgcolor=#fefefe
| 536507 ||  || — || March 31, 2008 || Mount Lemmon || Mount Lemmon Survey ||  || align=right data-sort-value="0.99" | 990 m || 
|-id=508 bgcolor=#E9E9E9
| 536508 ||  || — || January 17, 2007 || Catalina || CSS ||  || align=right data-sort-value="0.81" | 810 m || 
|-id=509 bgcolor=#E9E9E9
| 536509 ||  || — || December 17, 2009 || Mount Lemmon || Mount Lemmon Survey ||  || align=right | 2.6 km || 
|-id=510 bgcolor=#fefefe
| 536510 ||  || — || April 13, 2004 || Kitt Peak || Spacewatch || MAS || align=right data-sort-value="0.65" | 650 m || 
|-id=511 bgcolor=#d6d6d6
| 536511 ||  || — || February 22, 1998 || Kitt Peak || Spacewatch ||  || align=right | 3.0 km || 
|-id=512 bgcolor=#E9E9E9
| 536512 ||  || — || January 23, 2006 || Mount Lemmon || Mount Lemmon Survey ||  || align=right | 1.8 km || 
|-id=513 bgcolor=#E9E9E9
| 536513 ||  || — || April 18, 2007 || Kitt Peak || Spacewatch ||  || align=right data-sort-value="0.72" | 720 m || 
|-id=514 bgcolor=#fefefe
| 536514 ||  || — || April 13, 2004 || Kitt Peak || Spacewatch ||  || align=right data-sort-value="0.67" | 670 m || 
|-id=515 bgcolor=#E9E9E9
| 536515 ||  || — || May 17, 2010 || WISE || WISE ||  || align=right | 1.7 km || 
|-id=516 bgcolor=#E9E9E9
| 536516 ||  || — || January 23, 2015 || Haleakala || Pan-STARRS ||  || align=right | 2.0 km || 
|-id=517 bgcolor=#E9E9E9
| 536517 ||  || — || January 23, 2015 || Haleakala || Pan-STARRS ||  || align=right | 1.8 km || 
|-id=518 bgcolor=#E9E9E9
| 536518 ||  || — || May 1, 2011 || Haleakala || Pan-STARRS ||  || align=right | 1.1 km || 
|-id=519 bgcolor=#E9E9E9
| 536519 ||  || — || November 9, 2013 || Haleakala || Pan-STARRS ||  || align=right | 1.1 km || 
|-id=520 bgcolor=#E9E9E9
| 536520 ||  || — || December 11, 2009 || La Sagra || OAM Obs. ||  || align=right | 1.9 km || 
|-id=521 bgcolor=#d6d6d6
| 536521 ||  || — || January 28, 2015 || Haleakala || Pan-STARRS ||  || align=right | 3.2 km || 
|-id=522 bgcolor=#E9E9E9
| 536522 ||  || — || February 23, 2015 || Haleakala || Pan-STARRS ||  || align=right | 1.6 km || 
|-id=523 bgcolor=#E9E9E9
| 536523 ||  || — || September 4, 2007 || Catalina || CSS ||  || align=right | 1.4 km || 
|-id=524 bgcolor=#E9E9E9
| 536524 ||  || — || April 28, 2011 || Haleakala || Pan-STARRS ||  || align=right data-sort-value="0.79" | 790 m || 
|-id=525 bgcolor=#d6d6d6
| 536525 ||  || — || January 20, 2015 || Haleakala || Pan-STARRS ||  || align=right | 3.7 km || 
|-id=526 bgcolor=#E9E9E9
| 536526 ||  || — || October 2, 1999 || Kitt Peak || Spacewatch ||  || align=right | 2.1 km || 
|-id=527 bgcolor=#E9E9E9
| 536527 ||  || — || September 4, 2008 || Kitt Peak || Spacewatch || MAR || align=right | 1.1 km || 
|-id=528 bgcolor=#fefefe
| 536528 ||  || — || January 14, 2011 || Kitt Peak || Spacewatch || NYS || align=right data-sort-value="0.69" | 690 m || 
|-id=529 bgcolor=#E9E9E9
| 536529 ||  || — || February 26, 2010 || WISE || WISE || ADE || align=right | 1.8 km || 
|-id=530 bgcolor=#d6d6d6
| 536530 ||  || — || March 15, 2010 || WISE || WISE ||  || align=right | 2.5 km || 
|-id=531 bgcolor=#FFC2E0
| 536531 ||  || — || February 27, 2015 || Catalina || CSS || APOPHA || align=right data-sort-value="0.30" | 300 m || 
|-id=532 bgcolor=#E9E9E9
| 536532 ||  || — || September 7, 2004 || Kitt Peak || Spacewatch ||  || align=right | 1.3 km || 
|-id=533 bgcolor=#d6d6d6
| 536533 ||  || — || January 23, 2015 || Haleakala || Pan-STARRS || EOS || align=right | 1.7 km || 
|-id=534 bgcolor=#E9E9E9
| 536534 ||  || — || April 30, 2011 || Mount Lemmon || Mount Lemmon Survey ||  || align=right | 1.9 km || 
|-id=535 bgcolor=#E9E9E9
| 536535 ||  || — || October 10, 2008 || Mount Lemmon || Mount Lemmon Survey ||  || align=right | 1.7 km || 
|-id=536 bgcolor=#E9E9E9
| 536536 ||  || — || March 17, 2010 || WISE || WISE ||  || align=right | 1.3 km || 
|-id=537 bgcolor=#E9E9E9
| 536537 ||  || — || May 4, 2010 || WISE || WISE ||  || align=right | 2.1 km || 
|-id=538 bgcolor=#d6d6d6
| 536538 ||  || — || January 19, 2010 || WISE || WISE || EOS || align=right | 3.4 km || 
|-id=539 bgcolor=#fefefe
| 536539 ||  || — || August 26, 2013 || Haleakala || Pan-STARRS || H || align=right data-sort-value="0.62" | 620 m || 
|-id=540 bgcolor=#d6d6d6
| 536540 ||  || — || February 23, 2010 || WISE || WISE || VER || align=right | 3.1 km || 
|-id=541 bgcolor=#E9E9E9
| 536541 ||  || — || October 26, 2009 || Mount Lemmon || Mount Lemmon Survey || RAF || align=right data-sort-value="0.83" | 830 m || 
|-id=542 bgcolor=#d6d6d6
| 536542 ||  || — || April 11, 2005 || Mount Lemmon || Mount Lemmon Survey ||  || align=right | 2.5 km || 
|-id=543 bgcolor=#E9E9E9
| 536543 ||  || — || October 4, 2012 || Haleakala || Pan-STARRS ||  || align=right | 1.5 km || 
|-id=544 bgcolor=#d6d6d6
| 536544 ||  || — || March 10, 2005 || Mount Lemmon || Mount Lemmon Survey ||  || align=right | 2.2 km || 
|-id=545 bgcolor=#E9E9E9
| 536545 ||  || — || September 4, 2008 || Kitt Peak || Spacewatch || DOR || align=right | 2.1 km || 
|-id=546 bgcolor=#d6d6d6
| 536546 ||  || — || October 6, 2007 || Kitt Peak || Spacewatch ||  || align=right | 2.9 km || 
|-id=547 bgcolor=#d6d6d6
| 536547 ||  || — || February 16, 2010 || Mount Lemmon || Mount Lemmon Survey ||  || align=right | 2.8 km || 
|-id=548 bgcolor=#d6d6d6
| 536548 ||  || — || March 16, 2009 || Catalina || CSS || Tj (2.99) || align=right | 3.4 km || 
|-id=549 bgcolor=#E9E9E9
| 536549 ||  || — || June 22, 2007 || Kitt Peak || Spacewatch ||  || align=right data-sort-value="0.86" | 860 m || 
|-id=550 bgcolor=#d6d6d6
| 536550 ||  || — || September 24, 2012 || Mount Lemmon || Mount Lemmon Survey ||  || align=right | 2.0 km || 
|-id=551 bgcolor=#d6d6d6
| 536551 ||  || — || May 5, 2010 || Mount Lemmon || Mount Lemmon Survey ||  || align=right | 2.0 km || 
|-id=552 bgcolor=#d6d6d6
| 536552 ||  || — || April 11, 2005 || Mount Lemmon || Mount Lemmon Survey ||  || align=right | 2.3 km || 
|-id=553 bgcolor=#E9E9E9
| 536553 ||  || — || February 24, 2015 || Haleakala || Pan-STARRS ||  || align=right | 1.2 km || 
|-id=554 bgcolor=#d6d6d6
| 536554 ||  || — || August 9, 2007 || Kitt Peak || Spacewatch ||  || align=right | 2.1 km || 
|-id=555 bgcolor=#E9E9E9
| 536555 ||  || — || December 7, 2013 || Haleakala || Pan-STARRS ||  || align=right | 1.9 km || 
|-id=556 bgcolor=#E9E9E9
| 536556 ||  || — || September 18, 1995 || Kitt Peak || Spacewatch ||  || align=right | 1.7 km || 
|-id=557 bgcolor=#d6d6d6
| 536557 ||  || — || September 12, 2007 || Mount Lemmon || Mount Lemmon Survey ||  || align=right | 1.8 km || 
|-id=558 bgcolor=#d6d6d6
| 536558 ||  || — || February 27, 2015 || Haleakala || Pan-STARRS ||  || align=right | 1.7 km || 
|-id=559 bgcolor=#E9E9E9
| 536559 ||  || — || October 1, 2013 || Kitt Peak || Spacewatch ||  || align=right | 1.2 km || 
|-id=560 bgcolor=#d6d6d6
| 536560 ||  || — || December 7, 2008 || Mount Lemmon || Mount Lemmon Survey ||  || align=right | 3.0 km || 
|-id=561 bgcolor=#E9E9E9
| 536561 ||  || — || March 26, 2011 || Kitt Peak || Spacewatch ||  || align=right | 1.0 km || 
|-id=562 bgcolor=#fefefe
| 536562 ||  || — || January 29, 2011 || Mount Lemmon || Mount Lemmon Survey ||  || align=right data-sort-value="0.53" | 530 m || 
|-id=563 bgcolor=#fefefe
| 536563 ||  || — || February 10, 2007 || Mount Lemmon || Mount Lemmon Survey ||  || align=right data-sort-value="0.66" | 660 m || 
|-id=564 bgcolor=#E9E9E9
| 536564 ||  || — || February 23, 2007 || Mount Lemmon || Mount Lemmon Survey ||  || align=right data-sort-value="0.71" | 710 m || 
|-id=565 bgcolor=#d6d6d6
| 536565 ||  || — || November 12, 2007 || Mount Lemmon || Mount Lemmon Survey ||  || align=right | 2.6 km || 
|-id=566 bgcolor=#d6d6d6
| 536566 ||  || — || November 9, 2013 || Kitt Peak || Spacewatch ||  || align=right | 1.7 km || 
|-id=567 bgcolor=#d6d6d6
| 536567 ||  || — || September 19, 2012 || Mount Lemmon || Mount Lemmon Survey ||  || align=right | 2.3 km || 
|-id=568 bgcolor=#d6d6d6
| 536568 ||  || — || September 14, 2007 || Mount Lemmon || Mount Lemmon Survey ||  || align=right | 2.2 km || 
|-id=569 bgcolor=#E9E9E9
| 536569 ||  || — || February 16, 2015 || Haleakala || Pan-STARRS ||  || align=right | 2.0 km || 
|-id=570 bgcolor=#d6d6d6
| 536570 ||  || — || November 14, 2007 || Mount Lemmon || Mount Lemmon Survey ||  || align=right | 3.0 km || 
|-id=571 bgcolor=#E9E9E9
| 536571 ||  || — || March 26, 2007 || Kitt Peak || Spacewatch ||  || align=right data-sort-value="0.64" | 640 m || 
|-id=572 bgcolor=#d6d6d6
| 536572 ||  || — || September 13, 2007 || Mount Lemmon || Mount Lemmon Survey ||  || align=right | 2.3 km || 
|-id=573 bgcolor=#d6d6d6
| 536573 ||  || — || November 8, 2007 || Kitt Peak || Spacewatch ||  || align=right | 3.1 km || 
|-id=574 bgcolor=#d6d6d6
| 536574 ||  || — || February 2, 2010 || WISE || WISE ||  || align=right | 4.5 km || 
|-id=575 bgcolor=#d6d6d6
| 536575 ||  || — || February 24, 2015 || Haleakala || Pan-STARRS ||  || align=right | 2.6 km || 
|-id=576 bgcolor=#d6d6d6
| 536576 ||  || — || September 17, 1995 || Kitt Peak || Spacewatch ||  || align=right | 2.7 km || 
|-id=577 bgcolor=#d6d6d6
| 536577 ||  || — || November 3, 2007 || Mount Lemmon || Mount Lemmon Survey ||  || align=right | 2.6 km || 
|-id=578 bgcolor=#d6d6d6
| 536578 ||  || — || December 15, 2007 || Mount Lemmon || Mount Lemmon Survey ||  || align=right | 3.7 km || 
|-id=579 bgcolor=#E9E9E9
| 536579 ||  || — || February 18, 2015 || Haleakala || Pan-STARRS ||  || align=right | 2.5 km || 
|-id=580 bgcolor=#E9E9E9
| 536580 ||  || — || November 9, 2009 || Kitt Peak || Spacewatch ||  || align=right | 1.1 km || 
|-id=581 bgcolor=#d6d6d6
| 536581 ||  || — || April 10, 2010 || WISE || WISE ||  || align=right | 5.5 km || 
|-id=582 bgcolor=#fefefe
| 536582 ||  || — || October 18, 2009 || Mount Lemmon || Mount Lemmon Survey ||  || align=right data-sort-value="0.71" | 710 m || 
|-id=583 bgcolor=#d6d6d6
| 536583 ||  || — || February 18, 2015 || Kitt Peak || Spacewatch ||  || align=right | 2.5 km || 
|-id=584 bgcolor=#d6d6d6
| 536584 ||  || — || January 31, 2009 || Mount Lemmon || Mount Lemmon Survey ||  || align=right | 2.7 km || 
|-id=585 bgcolor=#d6d6d6
| 536585 ||  || — || September 22, 2012 || Kitt Peak || Spacewatch ||  || align=right | 2.7 km || 
|-id=586 bgcolor=#d6d6d6
| 536586 ||  || — || February 28, 2009 || Mount Lemmon || Mount Lemmon Survey ||  || align=right | 2.4 km || 
|-id=587 bgcolor=#E9E9E9
| 536587 ||  || — || February 18, 2015 || Mount Lemmon || Mount Lemmon Survey ||  || align=right | 1.6 km || 
|-id=588 bgcolor=#E9E9E9
| 536588 ||  || — || February 19, 2015 || Haleakala || Pan-STARRS ||  || align=right data-sort-value="0.86" | 860 m || 
|-id=589 bgcolor=#d6d6d6
| 536589 ||  || — || November 14, 2007 || Kitt Peak || Spacewatch ||  || align=right | 3.0 km || 
|-id=590 bgcolor=#E9E9E9
| 536590 ||  || — || November 16, 2009 || Mount Lemmon || Mount Lemmon Survey ||  || align=right | 2.4 km || 
|-id=591 bgcolor=#E9E9E9
| 536591 ||  || — || November 1, 2008 || Mount Lemmon || Mount Lemmon Survey ||  || align=right | 1.6 km || 
|-id=592 bgcolor=#E9E9E9
| 536592 ||  || — || March 29, 2011 || Kitt Peak || Spacewatch ||  || align=right | 1.2 km || 
|-id=593 bgcolor=#d6d6d6
| 536593 ||  || — || October 21, 2008 || Kitt Peak || Spacewatch ||  || align=right | 1.7 km || 
|-id=594 bgcolor=#E9E9E9
| 536594 ||  || — || March 2, 2011 || Kitt Peak || Spacewatch ||  || align=right | 1.3 km || 
|-id=595 bgcolor=#d6d6d6
| 536595 ||  || — || May 3, 2006 || Kitt Peak || Spacewatch ||  || align=right | 2.0 km || 
|-id=596 bgcolor=#E9E9E9
| 536596 ||  || — || August 17, 2012 || Haleakala || Pan-STARRS ||  || align=right | 1.6 km || 
|-id=597 bgcolor=#E9E9E9
| 536597 ||  || — || September 6, 2008 || Mount Lemmon || Mount Lemmon Survey ||  || align=right | 1.4 km || 
|-id=598 bgcolor=#d6d6d6
| 536598 ||  || — || November 20, 2008 || Kitt Peak || Spacewatch ||  || align=right | 1.9 km || 
|-id=599 bgcolor=#E9E9E9
| 536599 ||  || — || March 11, 2011 || Kitt Peak || Spacewatch ||  || align=right data-sort-value="0.78" | 780 m || 
|-id=600 bgcolor=#E9E9E9
| 536600 ||  || — || October 8, 2008 || Mount Lemmon || Mount Lemmon Survey ||  || align=right | 1.9 km || 
|}

536601–536700 

|-bgcolor=#E9E9E9
| 536601 ||  || — || September 25, 2008 || Kitt Peak || Spacewatch ||  || align=right | 1.8 km || 
|-id=602 bgcolor=#E9E9E9
| 536602 ||  || — || May 22, 2011 || Mount Lemmon || Mount Lemmon Survey ||  || align=right | 1.8 km || 
|-id=603 bgcolor=#E9E9E9
| 536603 ||  || — || September 26, 2008 || Kitt Peak || Spacewatch ||  || align=right | 1.4 km || 
|-id=604 bgcolor=#d6d6d6
| 536604 ||  || — || November 30, 2003 || Kitt Peak || Spacewatch ||  || align=right | 2.0 km || 
|-id=605 bgcolor=#d6d6d6
| 536605 ||  || — || January 13, 2008 || Kitt Peak || Spacewatch ||  || align=right | 3.4 km || 
|-id=606 bgcolor=#E9E9E9
| 536606 ||  || — || April 29, 2011 || Mount Lemmon || Mount Lemmon Survey ||  || align=right | 1.6 km || 
|-id=607 bgcolor=#d6d6d6
| 536607 ||  || — || October 26, 2008 || Mount Lemmon || Mount Lemmon Survey ||  || align=right | 2.9 km || 
|-id=608 bgcolor=#E9E9E9
| 536608 ||  || — || September 11, 2007 || Mount Lemmon || Mount Lemmon Survey ||  || align=right | 2.2 km || 
|-id=609 bgcolor=#E9E9E9
| 536609 ||  || — || August 26, 2012 || Haleakala || Pan-STARRS ||  || align=right | 1.9 km || 
|-id=610 bgcolor=#d6d6d6
| 536610 ||  || — || November 27, 2013 || Haleakala || Pan-STARRS ||  || align=right | 2.1 km || 
|-id=611 bgcolor=#E9E9E9
| 536611 ||  || — || February 16, 2015 || Haleakala || Pan-STARRS ||  || align=right data-sort-value="0.75" | 750 m || 
|-id=612 bgcolor=#fefefe
| 536612 ||  || — || April 13, 2004 || Kitt Peak || Spacewatch ||  || align=right data-sort-value="0.87" | 870 m || 
|-id=613 bgcolor=#d6d6d6
| 536613 ||  || — || October 17, 2012 || Haleakala || Pan-STARRS ||  || align=right | 3.1 km || 
|-id=614 bgcolor=#fefefe
| 536614 ||  || — || January 27, 2015 || Haleakala || Pan-STARRS ||  || align=right data-sort-value="0.82" | 820 m || 
|-id=615 bgcolor=#E9E9E9
| 536615 ||  || — || November 11, 2013 || Kitt Peak || Spacewatch ||  || align=right | 1.9 km || 
|-id=616 bgcolor=#fefefe
| 536616 ||  || — || February 8, 2011 || Mount Lemmon || Mount Lemmon Survey ||  || align=right data-sort-value="0.68" | 680 m || 
|-id=617 bgcolor=#d6d6d6
| 536617 ||  || — || September 2, 2007 || Mount Lemmon || Mount Lemmon Survey ||  || align=right | 2.6 km || 
|-id=618 bgcolor=#E9E9E9
| 536618 ||  || — || February 16, 2015 || Haleakala || Pan-STARRS ||  || align=right | 1.3 km || 
|-id=619 bgcolor=#E9E9E9
| 536619 ||  || — || December 30, 2005 || Kitt Peak || Spacewatch ||  || align=right | 1.1 km || 
|-id=620 bgcolor=#fefefe
| 536620 ||  || — || February 13, 2011 || Mount Lemmon || Mount Lemmon Survey ||  || align=right data-sort-value="0.62" | 620 m || 
|-id=621 bgcolor=#E9E9E9
| 536621 ||  || — || November 1, 2013 || Mount Lemmon || Mount Lemmon Survey ||  || align=right | 1.1 km || 
|-id=622 bgcolor=#E9E9E9
| 536622 ||  || — || February 16, 2015 || Haleakala || Pan-STARRS ||  || align=right | 1.3 km || 
|-id=623 bgcolor=#E9E9E9
| 536623 ||  || — || January 30, 2006 || Kitt Peak || Spacewatch ||  || align=right | 1.4 km || 
|-id=624 bgcolor=#E9E9E9
| 536624 ||  || — || September 6, 2008 || Mount Lemmon || Mount Lemmon Survey ||  || align=right data-sort-value="0.90" | 900 m || 
|-id=625 bgcolor=#E9E9E9
| 536625 ||  || — || August 26, 2012 || Haleakala || Pan-STARRS ||  || align=right | 2.0 km || 
|-id=626 bgcolor=#d6d6d6
| 536626 ||  || — || October 21, 2012 || Haleakala || Pan-STARRS || 7:4 || align=right | 2.6 km || 
|-id=627 bgcolor=#d6d6d6
| 536627 ||  || — || February 16, 2015 || Haleakala || Pan-STARRS ||  || align=right | 2.3 km || 
|-id=628 bgcolor=#E9E9E9
| 536628 ||  || — || January 9, 2006 || Kitt Peak || Spacewatch ||  || align=right | 1.2 km || 
|-id=629 bgcolor=#d6d6d6
| 536629 ||  || — || February 16, 2015 || Haleakala || Pan-STARRS ||  || align=right | 1.7 km || 
|-id=630 bgcolor=#d6d6d6
| 536630 ||  || — || January 20, 2015 || Haleakala || Pan-STARRS ||  || align=right | 1.5 km || 
|-id=631 bgcolor=#d6d6d6
| 536631 ||  || — || November 2, 2007 || Kitt Peak || Spacewatch ||  || align=right | 2.5 km || 
|-id=632 bgcolor=#fefefe
| 536632 ||  || — || February 17, 2015 || Haleakala || Pan-STARRS ||  || align=right data-sort-value="0.97" | 970 m || 
|-id=633 bgcolor=#E9E9E9
| 536633 ||  || — || January 21, 2015 || Haleakala || Pan-STARRS ||  || align=right | 2.1 km || 
|-id=634 bgcolor=#d6d6d6
| 536634 ||  || — || January 27, 2015 || Haleakala || Pan-STARRS ||  || align=right | 2.2 km || 
|-id=635 bgcolor=#d6d6d6
| 536635 ||  || — || February 17, 2015 || Haleakala || Pan-STARRS ||  || align=right | 2.7 km || 
|-id=636 bgcolor=#E9E9E9
| 536636 ||  || — || January 21, 2015 || Haleakala || Pan-STARRS ||  || align=right data-sort-value="0.85" | 850 m || 
|-id=637 bgcolor=#d6d6d6
| 536637 ||  || — || November 10, 2013 || Mount Lemmon || Mount Lemmon Survey ||  || align=right | 2.4 km || 
|-id=638 bgcolor=#E9E9E9
| 536638 ||  || — || January 20, 2015 || Haleakala || Pan-STARRS ||  || align=right | 1.0 km || 
|-id=639 bgcolor=#E9E9E9
| 536639 ||  || — || April 1, 2010 || WISE || WISE ||  || align=right | 1.3 km || 
|-id=640 bgcolor=#d6d6d6
| 536640 ||  || — || April 13, 2005 || Catalina || CSS ||  || align=right | 3.4 km || 
|-id=641 bgcolor=#E9E9E9
| 536641 ||  || — || February 18, 2015 || Haleakala || Pan-STARRS ||  || align=right | 2.3 km || 
|-id=642 bgcolor=#d6d6d6
| 536642 ||  || — || February 18, 2015 || Haleakala || Pan-STARRS ||  || align=right | 2.7 km || 
|-id=643 bgcolor=#E9E9E9
| 536643 ||  || — || March 13, 2011 || Mount Lemmon || Mount Lemmon Survey ||  || align=right | 1.1 km || 
|-id=644 bgcolor=#E9E9E9
| 536644 ||  || — || April 28, 2011 || Kitt Peak || Spacewatch ||  || align=right data-sort-value="0.96" | 960 m || 
|-id=645 bgcolor=#fefefe
| 536645 ||  || — || January 19, 2015 || Haleakala || Pan-STARRS ||  || align=right data-sort-value="0.66" | 660 m || 
|-id=646 bgcolor=#d6d6d6
| 536646 ||  || — || January 3, 2009 || Kitt Peak || Spacewatch ||  || align=right | 2.5 km || 
|-id=647 bgcolor=#d6d6d6
| 536647 ||  || — || October 18, 2012 || Haleakala || Pan-STARRS ||  || align=right | 2.7 km || 
|-id=648 bgcolor=#E9E9E9
| 536648 ||  || — || January 24, 2015 || Haleakala || Pan-STARRS ||  || align=right data-sort-value="0.91" | 910 m || 
|-id=649 bgcolor=#d6d6d6
| 536649 ||  || — || January 16, 2015 || Haleakala || Pan-STARRS ||  || align=right | 2.3 km || 
|-id=650 bgcolor=#fefefe
| 536650 ||  || — || January 20, 2015 || Haleakala || Pan-STARRS ||  || align=right data-sort-value="0.82" | 820 m || 
|-id=651 bgcolor=#E9E9E9
| 536651 ||  || — || February 23, 2015 || Haleakala || Pan-STARRS ||  || align=right | 2.2 km || 
|-id=652 bgcolor=#d6d6d6
| 536652 ||  || — || January 28, 2015 || Haleakala || Pan-STARRS ||  || align=right | 2.6 km || 
|-id=653 bgcolor=#E9E9E9
| 536653 ||  || — || January 28, 2015 || Haleakala || Pan-STARRS ||  || align=right | 1.3 km || 
|-id=654 bgcolor=#E9E9E9
| 536654 ||  || — || January 26, 2006 || Kitt Peak || Spacewatch ||  || align=right | 1.2 km || 
|-id=655 bgcolor=#d6d6d6
| 536655 ||  || — || February 23, 2015 || Haleakala || Pan-STARRS ||  || align=right | 2.5 km || 
|-id=656 bgcolor=#d6d6d6
| 536656 ||  || — || November 27, 2013 || Haleakala || Pan-STARRS ||  || align=right | 1.9 km || 
|-id=657 bgcolor=#E9E9E9
| 536657 ||  || — || September 6, 2013 || Kitt Peak || Spacewatch ||  || align=right | 1.2 km || 
|-id=658 bgcolor=#E9E9E9
| 536658 ||  || — || August 26, 2012 || Haleakala || Pan-STARRS ||  || align=right | 1.9 km || 
|-id=659 bgcolor=#fefefe
| 536659 ||  || — || January 30, 2011 || Haleakala || Pan-STARRS ||  || align=right data-sort-value="0.69" | 690 m || 
|-id=660 bgcolor=#d6d6d6
| 536660 ||  || — || January 20, 2009 || Kitt Peak || Spacewatch ||  || align=right | 2.0 km || 
|-id=661 bgcolor=#E9E9E9
| 536661 ||  || — || May 29, 2011 || Mount Lemmon || Mount Lemmon Survey ||  || align=right | 1.4 km || 
|-id=662 bgcolor=#E9E9E9
| 536662 ||  || — || January 23, 2015 || Haleakala || Pan-STARRS ||  || align=right | 1.3 km || 
|-id=663 bgcolor=#E9E9E9
| 536663 ||  || — || December 2, 2005 || Kitt Peak || Spacewatch ||  || align=right data-sort-value="0.75" | 750 m || 
|-id=664 bgcolor=#d6d6d6
| 536664 ||  || — || February 25, 2015 || Haleakala || Pan-STARRS ||  || align=right | 2.9 km || 
|-id=665 bgcolor=#d6d6d6
| 536665 ||  || — || April 15, 2010 || Mount Lemmon || Mount Lemmon Survey ||  || align=right | 2.0 km || 
|-id=666 bgcolor=#d6d6d6
| 536666 ||  || — || October 15, 2012 || Haleakala || Pan-STARRS ||  || align=right | 3.3 km || 
|-id=667 bgcolor=#E9E9E9
| 536667 ||  || — || January 20, 2015 || Haleakala || Pan-STARRS ||  || align=right data-sort-value="0.84" | 840 m || 
|-id=668 bgcolor=#d6d6d6
| 536668 ||  || — || February 27, 2015 || Haleakala || Pan-STARRS ||  || align=right | 2.1 km || 
|-id=669 bgcolor=#E9E9E9
| 536669 ||  || — || November 6, 2013 || Haleakala || Pan-STARRS ||  || align=right | 1.3 km || 
|-id=670 bgcolor=#E9E9E9
| 536670 ||  || — || November 9, 2013 || Haleakala || Pan-STARRS ||  || align=right data-sort-value="0.72" | 720 m || 
|-id=671 bgcolor=#E9E9E9
| 536671 ||  || — || April 19, 2007 || Kitt Peak || Spacewatch ||  || align=right | 1.2 km || 
|-id=672 bgcolor=#E9E9E9
| 536672 ||  || — || February 27, 2015 || Haleakala || Pan-STARRS ||  || align=right data-sort-value="0.81" | 810 m || 
|-id=673 bgcolor=#fefefe
| 536673 ||  || — || February 16, 2015 || Haleakala || Pan-STARRS ||  || align=right data-sort-value="0.70" | 700 m || 
|-id=674 bgcolor=#E9E9E9
| 536674 ||  || — || February 17, 2015 || Haleakala || Pan-STARRS ||  || align=right | 1.9 km || 
|-id=675 bgcolor=#d6d6d6
| 536675 ||  || — || February 19, 2009 || Kitt Peak || Spacewatch ||  || align=right | 3.1 km || 
|-id=676 bgcolor=#fefefe
| 536676 ||  || — || September 25, 2013 || Mount Lemmon || Mount Lemmon Survey ||  || align=right data-sort-value="0.71" | 710 m || 
|-id=677 bgcolor=#E9E9E9
| 536677 ||  || — || February 17, 2015 || Haleakala || Pan-STARRS ||  || align=right data-sort-value="0.88" | 880 m || 
|-id=678 bgcolor=#d6d6d6
| 536678 ||  || — || February 16, 2015 || Haleakala || Pan-STARRS ||  || align=right | 2.8 km || 
|-id=679 bgcolor=#d6d6d6
| 536679 ||  || — || October 10, 2007 || Mount Lemmon || Mount Lemmon Survey ||  || align=right | 2.8 km || 
|-id=680 bgcolor=#E9E9E9
| 536680 ||  || — || February 20, 2015 || Haleakala || Pan-STARRS ||  || align=right | 1.3 km || 
|-id=681 bgcolor=#d6d6d6
| 536681 ||  || — || June 28, 2010 || WISE || WISE ||  || align=right | 2.3 km || 
|-id=682 bgcolor=#d6d6d6
| 536682 ||  || — || August 26, 2012 || Haleakala || Pan-STARRS ||  || align=right | 2.8 km || 
|-id=683 bgcolor=#d6d6d6
| 536683 ||  || — || April 28, 2010 || WISE || WISE ||  || align=right | 2.4 km || 
|-id=684 bgcolor=#E9E9E9
| 536684 ||  || — || April 13, 2011 || Mount Lemmon || Mount Lemmon Survey ||  || align=right | 1.3 km || 
|-id=685 bgcolor=#fefefe
| 536685 ||  || — || October 1, 2013 || Mount Lemmon || Mount Lemmon Survey ||  || align=right data-sort-value="0.61" | 610 m || 
|-id=686 bgcolor=#E9E9E9
| 536686 ||  || — || December 28, 2005 || Mount Lemmon || Mount Lemmon Survey ||  || align=right | 1.2 km || 
|-id=687 bgcolor=#d6d6d6
| 536687 ||  || — || November 6, 2013 || Haleakala || Pan-STARRS ||  || align=right | 2.8 km || 
|-id=688 bgcolor=#fefefe
| 536688 ||  || — || November 15, 2006 || Mount Lemmon || Mount Lemmon Survey ||  || align=right data-sort-value="0.54" | 540 m || 
|-id=689 bgcolor=#E9E9E9
| 536689 ||  || — || January 22, 2006 || Catalina || CSS ||  || align=right | 1.3 km || 
|-id=690 bgcolor=#E9E9E9
| 536690 ||  || — || April 2, 1994 || Kitt Peak || Spacewatch ||  || align=right | 1.3 km || 
|-id=691 bgcolor=#d6d6d6
| 536691 ||  || — || January 29, 2015 || Haleakala || Pan-STARRS ||  || align=right | 2.3 km || 
|-id=692 bgcolor=#d6d6d6
| 536692 ||  || — || August 22, 2012 || Haleakala || Pan-STARRS ||  || align=right | 2.7 km || 
|-id=693 bgcolor=#E9E9E9
| 536693 ||  || — || August 15, 2013 || Haleakala || Pan-STARRS ||  || align=right data-sort-value="0.72" | 720 m || 
|-id=694 bgcolor=#E9E9E9
| 536694 ||  || — || November 4, 2005 || Mount Lemmon || Mount Lemmon Survey ||  || align=right data-sort-value="0.71" | 710 m || 
|-id=695 bgcolor=#d6d6d6
| 536695 ||  || — || November 2, 2008 || Kitt Peak || Spacewatch ||  || align=right | 2.7 km || 
|-id=696 bgcolor=#d6d6d6
| 536696 ||  || — || April 10, 2005 || Mount Lemmon || Mount Lemmon Survey ||  || align=right | 2.6 km || 
|-id=697 bgcolor=#d6d6d6
| 536697 ||  || — || January 23, 2010 || WISE || WISE ||  || align=right | 2.9 km || 
|-id=698 bgcolor=#E9E9E9
| 536698 ||  || — || November 30, 2005 || Kitt Peak || Spacewatch ||  || align=right | 1.1 km || 
|-id=699 bgcolor=#E9E9E9
| 536699 ||  || — || November 9, 2013 || Haleakala || Pan-STARRS ||  || align=right data-sort-value="0.94" | 940 m || 
|-id=700 bgcolor=#fefefe
| 536700 ||  || — || October 23, 2013 || Mount Lemmon || Mount Lemmon Survey ||  || align=right data-sort-value="0.76" | 760 m || 
|}

536701–536800 

|-bgcolor=#fefefe
| 536701 ||  || — || May 29, 2012 || Mount Lemmon || Mount Lemmon Survey ||  || align=right data-sort-value="0.76" | 760 m || 
|-id=702 bgcolor=#d6d6d6
| 536702 ||  || — || March 20, 2010 || Kitt Peak || Spacewatch ||  || align=right | 3.4 km || 
|-id=703 bgcolor=#fefefe
| 536703 ||  || — || March 27, 2000 || Kitt Peak || Spacewatch ||  || align=right data-sort-value="0.56" | 560 m || 
|-id=704 bgcolor=#E9E9E9
| 536704 ||  || — || September 6, 2008 || Mount Lemmon || Mount Lemmon Survey ||  || align=right | 1.3 km || 
|-id=705 bgcolor=#d6d6d6
| 536705 ||  || — || March 20, 2010 || Mount Lemmon || Mount Lemmon Survey ||  || align=right | 3.8 km || 
|-id=706 bgcolor=#E9E9E9
| 536706 ||  || — || November 8, 2009 || Mount Lemmon || Mount Lemmon Survey ||  || align=right | 2.3 km || 
|-id=707 bgcolor=#fefefe
| 536707 ||  || — || February 7, 2008 || Kitt Peak || Spacewatch ||  || align=right data-sort-value="0.77" | 770 m || 
|-id=708 bgcolor=#E9E9E9
| 536708 ||  || — || January 21, 2015 || Haleakala || Pan-STARRS ||  || align=right data-sort-value="0.96" | 960 m || 
|-id=709 bgcolor=#d6d6d6
| 536709 ||  || — || February 18, 2010 || Mount Lemmon || Mount Lemmon Survey ||  || align=right | 1.9 km || 
|-id=710 bgcolor=#fefefe
| 536710 ||  || — || October 27, 2005 || Kitt Peak || Spacewatch ||  || align=right data-sort-value="0.88" | 880 m || 
|-id=711 bgcolor=#E9E9E9
| 536711 ||  || — || August 5, 2003 || Kitt Peak || Spacewatch ||  || align=right | 2.5 km || 
|-id=712 bgcolor=#fefefe
| 536712 ||  || — || October 26, 1994 || Kitt Peak || Spacewatch ||  || align=right data-sort-value="0.74" | 740 m || 
|-id=713 bgcolor=#E9E9E9
| 536713 ||  || — || September 15, 2013 || Haleakala || Pan-STARRS ||  || align=right | 1.9 km || 
|-id=714 bgcolor=#fefefe
| 536714 ||  || — || February 28, 2008 || Kitt Peak || Spacewatch ||  || align=right data-sort-value="0.64" | 640 m || 
|-id=715 bgcolor=#d6d6d6
| 536715 ||  || — || December 17, 2009 || Kitt Peak || Spacewatch ||  || align=right | 2.9 km || 
|-id=716 bgcolor=#E9E9E9
| 536716 ||  || — || February 16, 2015 || Haleakala || Pan-STARRS ||  || align=right data-sort-value="0.94" | 940 m || 
|-id=717 bgcolor=#d6d6d6
| 536717 ||  || — || September 9, 2007 || Kitt Peak || Spacewatch ||  || align=right | 2.6 km || 
|-id=718 bgcolor=#fefefe
| 536718 ||  || — || October 1, 2013 || Mount Lemmon || Mount Lemmon Survey ||  || align=right data-sort-value="0.79" | 790 m || 
|-id=719 bgcolor=#d6d6d6
| 536719 ||  || — || February 28, 2010 || WISE || WISE ||  || align=right | 2.7 km || 
|-id=720 bgcolor=#d6d6d6
| 536720 ||  || — || April 25, 2004 || Kitt Peak || Spacewatch ||  || align=right | 5.3 km || 
|-id=721 bgcolor=#d6d6d6
| 536721 ||  || — || January 1, 2009 || Kitt Peak || Spacewatch ||  || align=right | 3.0 km || 
|-id=722 bgcolor=#E9E9E9
| 536722 ||  || — || September 22, 2009 || Kitt Peak || Spacewatch ||  || align=right data-sort-value="0.91" | 910 m || 
|-id=723 bgcolor=#d6d6d6
| 536723 ||  || — || May 4, 2005 || Kitt Peak || Spacewatch ||  || align=right | 2.7 km || 
|-id=724 bgcolor=#E9E9E9
| 536724 ||  || — || September 12, 2013 || Mount Lemmon || Mount Lemmon Survey ||  || align=right | 1.7 km || 
|-id=725 bgcolor=#d6d6d6
| 536725 ||  || — || October 7, 2008 || Mount Lemmon || Mount Lemmon Survey ||  || align=right | 2.2 km || 
|-id=726 bgcolor=#E9E9E9
| 536726 ||  || — || March 29, 2011 || Catalina || CSS ||  || align=right | 1.3 km || 
|-id=727 bgcolor=#d6d6d6
| 536727 ||  || — || March 16, 2004 || Kitt Peak || Spacewatch ||  || align=right | 2.6 km || 
|-id=728 bgcolor=#fefefe
| 536728 ||  || — || April 22, 2004 || Kitt Peak || Spacewatch ||  || align=right data-sort-value="0.59" | 590 m || 
|-id=729 bgcolor=#E9E9E9
| 536729 ||  || — || January 4, 2006 || Kitt Peak || Spacewatch ||  || align=right | 1.3 km || 
|-id=730 bgcolor=#fefefe
| 536730 ||  || — || January 16, 2011 || Mount Lemmon || Mount Lemmon Survey ||  || align=right data-sort-value="0.65" | 650 m || 
|-id=731 bgcolor=#E9E9E9
| 536731 ||  || — || March 6, 2011 || Mount Lemmon || Mount Lemmon Survey ||  || align=right data-sort-value="0.67" | 670 m || 
|-id=732 bgcolor=#E9E9E9
| 536732 ||  || — || October 3, 2013 || Haleakala || Pan-STARRS ||  || align=right | 1.2 km || 
|-id=733 bgcolor=#d6d6d6
| 536733 ||  || — || February 17, 2015 || Haleakala || Pan-STARRS ||  || align=right | 2.4 km || 
|-id=734 bgcolor=#fefefe
| 536734 ||  || — || April 14, 2008 || Kitt Peak || Spacewatch ||  || align=right data-sort-value="0.68" | 680 m || 
|-id=735 bgcolor=#d6d6d6
| 536735 ||  || — || August 10, 2007 || Kitt Peak || Spacewatch ||  || align=right | 2.0 km || 
|-id=736 bgcolor=#E9E9E9
| 536736 ||  || — || October 27, 2009 || Kitt Peak || Spacewatch ||  || align=right | 1.3 km || 
|-id=737 bgcolor=#E9E9E9
| 536737 ||  || — || September 16, 2009 || Kitt Peak || Spacewatch ||  || align=right | 1.0 km || 
|-id=738 bgcolor=#d6d6d6
| 536738 ||  || — || November 19, 2008 || Kitt Peak || Spacewatch ||  || align=right | 2.9 km || 
|-id=739 bgcolor=#E9E9E9
| 536739 ||  || — || April 4, 2011 || Mount Lemmon || Mount Lemmon Survey ||  || align=right | 1.4 km || 
|-id=740 bgcolor=#fefefe
| 536740 ||  || — || March 5, 2008 || Kitt Peak || Spacewatch ||  || align=right data-sort-value="0.77" | 770 m || 
|-id=741 bgcolor=#E9E9E9
| 536741 ||  || — || November 20, 2001 || Socorro || LINEAR ||  || align=right | 1.3 km || 
|-id=742 bgcolor=#E9E9E9
| 536742 ||  || — || April 16, 2007 || Mount Lemmon || Mount Lemmon Survey ||  || align=right | 1.9 km || 
|-id=743 bgcolor=#E9E9E9
| 536743 ||  || — || October 22, 2009 || Mount Lemmon || Mount Lemmon Survey ||  || align=right | 1.6 km || 
|-id=744 bgcolor=#d6d6d6
| 536744 ||  || — || September 9, 2007 || Kitt Peak || Spacewatch ||  || align=right | 2.3 km || 
|-id=745 bgcolor=#fefefe
| 536745 ||  || — || September 14, 2006 || Kitt Peak || Spacewatch ||  || align=right data-sort-value="0.69" | 690 m || 
|-id=746 bgcolor=#E9E9E9
| 536746 ||  || — || December 30, 2013 || Haleakala || Pan-STARRS ||  || align=right | 1.2 km || 
|-id=747 bgcolor=#d6d6d6
| 536747 ||  || — || December 19, 2003 || Kitt Peak || Spacewatch ||  || align=right | 2.2 km || 
|-id=748 bgcolor=#fefefe
| 536748 ||  || — || March 16, 2015 || Haleakala || Pan-STARRS ||  || align=right data-sort-value="0.87" | 870 m || 
|-id=749 bgcolor=#d6d6d6
| 536749 ||  || — || December 31, 2008 || Catalina || CSS ||  || align=right | 3.2 km || 
|-id=750 bgcolor=#d6d6d6
| 536750 ||  || — || November 1, 2007 || Kitt Peak || Spacewatch ||  || align=right | 2.9 km || 
|-id=751 bgcolor=#d6d6d6
| 536751 ||  || — || April 15, 2010 || Mount Lemmon || Mount Lemmon Survey ||  || align=right | 3.1 km || 
|-id=752 bgcolor=#E9E9E9
| 536752 ||  || — || February 4, 2006 || Catalina || CSS ||  || align=right | 1.4 km || 
|-id=753 bgcolor=#d6d6d6
| 536753 ||  || — || January 3, 2009 || Catalina || CSS ||  || align=right | 3.3 km || 
|-id=754 bgcolor=#E9E9E9
| 536754 ||  || — || February 18, 2015 || Haleakala || Pan-STARRS ||  || align=right data-sort-value="0.74" | 740 m || 
|-id=755 bgcolor=#d6d6d6
| 536755 ||  || — || December 31, 2013 || Catalina || CSS ||  || align=right | 3.3 km || 
|-id=756 bgcolor=#d6d6d6
| 536756 ||  || — || May 17, 2010 || Kitt Peak || Spacewatch ||  || align=right | 2.6 km || 
|-id=757 bgcolor=#E9E9E9
| 536757 ||  || — || May 5, 2011 || Mount Lemmon || Mount Lemmon Survey ||  || align=right data-sort-value="0.87" | 870 m || 
|-id=758 bgcolor=#E9E9E9
| 536758 ||  || — || October 14, 2013 || Kitt Peak || Spacewatch ||  || align=right data-sort-value="0.78" | 780 m || 
|-id=759 bgcolor=#E9E9E9
| 536759 ||  || — || January 31, 2015 || Haleakala || Pan-STARRS ||  || align=right | 1.4 km || 
|-id=760 bgcolor=#E9E9E9
| 536760 ||  || — || April 14, 2007 || Mount Lemmon || Mount Lemmon Survey ||  || align=right data-sort-value="0.80" | 800 m || 
|-id=761 bgcolor=#d6d6d6
| 536761 ||  || — || October 3, 2006 || Mount Lemmon || Mount Lemmon Survey ||  || align=right | 3.3 km || 
|-id=762 bgcolor=#E9E9E9
| 536762 ||  || — || October 6, 2008 || Mount Lemmon || Mount Lemmon Survey ||  || align=right | 1.0 km || 
|-id=763 bgcolor=#E9E9E9
| 536763 ||  || — || August 12, 2012 || Kitt Peak || Spacewatch ||  || align=right | 3.0 km || 
|-id=764 bgcolor=#d6d6d6
| 536764 ||  || — || October 10, 2007 || Kitt Peak || Spacewatch ||  || align=right | 2.3 km || 
|-id=765 bgcolor=#E9E9E9
| 536765 ||  || — || March 16, 2007 || Kitt Peak || Spacewatch ||  || align=right | 1.7 km || 
|-id=766 bgcolor=#E9E9E9
| 536766 ||  || — || October 28, 2014 || Haleakala || Pan-STARRS ||  || align=right | 1.2 km || 
|-id=767 bgcolor=#E9E9E9
| 536767 ||  || — || December 8, 2014 || Haleakala || Pan-STARRS ||  || align=right | 1.3 km || 
|-id=768 bgcolor=#E9E9E9
| 536768 ||  || — || March 26, 2011 || Haleakala || Pan-STARRS ||  || align=right | 1.4 km || 
|-id=769 bgcolor=#d6d6d6
| 536769 ||  || — || November 1, 2013 || Mount Lemmon || Mount Lemmon Survey ||  || align=right | 2.4 km || 
|-id=770 bgcolor=#E9E9E9
| 536770 ||  || — || February 25, 2010 || WISE || WISE ||  || align=right | 2.1 km || 
|-id=771 bgcolor=#fefefe
| 536771 ||  || — || October 4, 2013 || Mount Lemmon || Mount Lemmon Survey ||  || align=right data-sort-value="0.58" | 580 m || 
|-id=772 bgcolor=#d6d6d6
| 536772 ||  || — || November 29, 2014 || Mount Lemmon || Mount Lemmon Survey ||  || align=right | 3.6 km || 
|-id=773 bgcolor=#E9E9E9
| 536773 ||  || — || February 20, 2015 || Haleakala || Pan-STARRS ||  || align=right | 1.1 km || 
|-id=774 bgcolor=#E9E9E9
| 536774 ||  || — || December 20, 2009 || Mount Lemmon || Mount Lemmon Survey ||  || align=right | 1.6 km || 
|-id=775 bgcolor=#E9E9E9
| 536775 ||  || — || January 28, 2015 || Haleakala || Pan-STARRS ||  || align=right | 1.1 km || 
|-id=776 bgcolor=#E9E9E9
| 536776 ||  || — || March 18, 2015 || Haleakala || Pan-STARRS ||  || align=right | 1.5 km || 
|-id=777 bgcolor=#E9E9E9
| 536777 ||  || — || December 17, 2009 || Kitt Peak || Spacewatch ||  || align=right | 2.6 km || 
|-id=778 bgcolor=#E9E9E9
| 536778 ||  || — || March 10, 2011 || Mount Lemmon || Mount Lemmon Survey ||  || align=right data-sort-value="0.91" | 910 m || 
|-id=779 bgcolor=#E9E9E9
| 536779 ||  || — || April 24, 2006 || Mount Lemmon || Mount Lemmon Survey ||  || align=right | 1.8 km || 
|-id=780 bgcolor=#d6d6d6
| 536780 ||  || — || February 13, 2010 || WISE || WISE ||  || align=right | 3.0 km || 
|-id=781 bgcolor=#E9E9E9
| 536781 ||  || — || May 29, 2003 || Kitt Peak || Spacewatch ||  || align=right | 1.3 km || 
|-id=782 bgcolor=#E9E9E9
| 536782 ||  || — || October 10, 2012 || Mount Lemmon || Mount Lemmon Survey ||  || align=right | 1.5 km || 
|-id=783 bgcolor=#d6d6d6
| 536783 ||  || — || April 15, 2010 || Mount Lemmon || Mount Lemmon Survey ||  || align=right | 3.0 km || 
|-id=784 bgcolor=#d6d6d6
| 536784 ||  || — || November 20, 2008 || Kitt Peak || Spacewatch ||  || align=right | 2.6 km || 
|-id=785 bgcolor=#E9E9E9
| 536785 ||  || — || July 21, 2012 || Siding Spring || SSS ||  || align=right | 2.0 km || 
|-id=786 bgcolor=#E9E9E9
| 536786 ||  || — || May 26, 2011 || Mount Lemmon || Mount Lemmon Survey ||  || align=right | 1.3 km || 
|-id=787 bgcolor=#E9E9E9
| 536787 ||  || — || September 6, 2008 || Mount Lemmon || Mount Lemmon Survey ||  || align=right | 1.4 km || 
|-id=788 bgcolor=#E9E9E9
| 536788 ||  || — || February 9, 2010 || WISE || WISE ||  || align=right | 1.0 km || 
|-id=789 bgcolor=#E9E9E9
| 536789 ||  || — || April 2, 2011 || Haleakala || Pan-STARRS ||  || align=right data-sort-value="0.92" | 920 m || 
|-id=790 bgcolor=#fefefe
| 536790 ||  || — || February 4, 2011 || Haleakala || Pan-STARRS ||  || align=right data-sort-value="0.63" | 630 m || 
|-id=791 bgcolor=#fefefe
| 536791 ||  || — || February 4, 2011 || Haleakala || Pan-STARRS || V || align=right data-sort-value="0.48" | 480 m || 
|-id=792 bgcolor=#d6d6d6
| 536792 ||  || — || January 20, 2015 || Haleakala || Pan-STARRS ||  || align=right | 2.2 km || 
|-id=793 bgcolor=#E9E9E9
| 536793 ||  || — || January 23, 2015 || Haleakala || Pan-STARRS ||  || align=right | 1.2 km || 
|-id=794 bgcolor=#E9E9E9
| 536794 ||  || — || January 22, 2015 || Haleakala || Pan-STARRS ||  || align=right | 1.2 km || 
|-id=795 bgcolor=#E9E9E9
| 536795 ||  || — || September 8, 2008 || Kitt Peak || Spacewatch ||  || align=right | 1.5 km || 
|-id=796 bgcolor=#fefefe
| 536796 ||  || — || January 30, 2011 || Haleakala || Pan-STARRS || NYS || align=right data-sort-value="0.64" | 640 m || 
|-id=797 bgcolor=#E9E9E9
| 536797 ||  || — || January 25, 2015 || Haleakala || Pan-STARRS ||  || align=right | 1.2 km || 
|-id=798 bgcolor=#E9E9E9
| 536798 ||  || — || February 2, 2006 || Kitt Peak || Spacewatch ||  || align=right | 1.4 km || 
|-id=799 bgcolor=#E9E9E9
| 536799 ||  || — || February 4, 2006 || Catalina || CSS ||  || align=right | 2.9 km || 
|-id=800 bgcolor=#E9E9E9
| 536800 ||  || — || January 23, 2015 || Haleakala || Pan-STARRS ||  || align=right data-sort-value="0.84" | 840 m || 
|}

536801–536900 

|-bgcolor=#E9E9E9
| 536801 ||  || — || January 20, 2015 || Haleakala || Pan-STARRS ||  || align=right data-sort-value="0.97" | 970 m || 
|-id=802 bgcolor=#d6d6d6
| 536802 ||  || — || August 29, 2006 || Kitt Peak || Spacewatch ||  || align=right | 3.1 km || 
|-id=803 bgcolor=#d6d6d6
| 536803 ||  || — || November 4, 1996 || Kitt Peak || Spacewatch || Tj (2.99) || align=right | 3.2 km || 
|-id=804 bgcolor=#fefefe
| 536804 ||  || — || November 5, 2005 || Kitt Peak || Spacewatch ||  || align=right data-sort-value="0.76" | 760 m || 
|-id=805 bgcolor=#E9E9E9
| 536805 ||  || — || November 27, 2013 || Haleakala || Pan-STARRS ||  || align=right | 1.3 km || 
|-id=806 bgcolor=#E9E9E9
| 536806 ||  || — || October 24, 2008 || Kitt Peak || Spacewatch ||  || align=right | 1.9 km || 
|-id=807 bgcolor=#fefefe
| 536807 ||  || — || August 17, 2012 || Haleakala || Pan-STARRS || MAS || align=right data-sort-value="0.67" | 670 m || 
|-id=808 bgcolor=#E9E9E9
| 536808 ||  || — || April 6, 2011 || Kitt Peak || Spacewatch || ADE || align=right | 1.3 km || 
|-id=809 bgcolor=#E9E9E9
| 536809 ||  || — || April 26, 2011 || Mount Lemmon || Mount Lemmon Survey ||  || align=right | 1.0 km || 
|-id=810 bgcolor=#E9E9E9
| 536810 ||  || — || February 9, 2010 || Mount Lemmon || Mount Lemmon Survey ||  || align=right | 1.7 km || 
|-id=811 bgcolor=#E9E9E9
| 536811 ||  || — || April 26, 2011 || Mount Lemmon || Mount Lemmon Survey ||  || align=right data-sort-value="0.77" | 770 m || 
|-id=812 bgcolor=#E9E9E9
| 536812 ||  || — || March 24, 2006 || Kitt Peak || Spacewatch ||  || align=right | 2.0 km || 
|-id=813 bgcolor=#E9E9E9
| 536813 ||  || — || March 21, 2015 || Haleakala || Pan-STARRS ||  || align=right | 1.7 km || 
|-id=814 bgcolor=#fefefe
| 536814 ||  || — || January 10, 2007 || Kitt Peak || Spacewatch ||  || align=right data-sort-value="0.76" | 760 m || 
|-id=815 bgcolor=#E9E9E9
| 536815 ||  || — || September 18, 2012 || Kitt Peak || Spacewatch ||  || align=right | 1.3 km || 
|-id=816 bgcolor=#E9E9E9
| 536816 ||  || — || March 21, 2015 || Haleakala || Pan-STARRS ||  || align=right | 1.0 km || 
|-id=817 bgcolor=#E9E9E9
| 536817 ||  || — || February 6, 2006 || Kitt Peak || Spacewatch || JUN || align=right data-sort-value="0.95" | 950 m || 
|-id=818 bgcolor=#E9E9E9
| 536818 ||  || — || January 12, 2010 || Kitt Peak || Spacewatch ||  || align=right | 1.6 km || 
|-id=819 bgcolor=#E9E9E9
| 536819 ||  || — || May 1, 2011 || Haleakala || Pan-STARRS ||  || align=right data-sort-value="0.82" | 820 m || 
|-id=820 bgcolor=#E9E9E9
| 536820 ||  || — || March 21, 2015 || Haleakala || Pan-STARRS ||  || align=right | 1.3 km || 
|-id=821 bgcolor=#E9E9E9
| 536821 ||  || — || January 25, 2015 || Haleakala || Pan-STARRS || MAR || align=right data-sort-value="0.90" | 900 m || 
|-id=822 bgcolor=#E9E9E9
| 536822 ||  || — || May 15, 2010 || WISE || WISE ||  || align=right | 3.0 km || 
|-id=823 bgcolor=#d6d6d6
| 536823 ||  || — || November 7, 2007 || Kitt Peak || Spacewatch ||  || align=right | 2.5 km || 
|-id=824 bgcolor=#d6d6d6
| 536824 ||  || — || October 20, 2012 || Haleakala || Pan-STARRS || EOS || align=right | 2.0 km || 
|-id=825 bgcolor=#E9E9E9
| 536825 ||  || — || March 14, 2010 || WISE || WISE ||  || align=right | 1.5 km || 
|-id=826 bgcolor=#E9E9E9
| 536826 ||  || — || October 23, 2013 || Haleakala || Pan-STARRS ||  || align=right data-sort-value="0.82" | 820 m || 
|-id=827 bgcolor=#d6d6d6
| 536827 ||  || — || March 14, 2010 || Kitt Peak || Spacewatch ||  || align=right | 4.0 km || 
|-id=828 bgcolor=#E9E9E9
| 536828 ||  || — || April 30, 2006 || Kitt Peak || Spacewatch || AGN || align=right | 1.6 km || 
|-id=829 bgcolor=#E9E9E9
| 536829 ||  || — || April 9, 2010 || WISE || WISE || NEM || align=right | 2.0 km || 
|-id=830 bgcolor=#d6d6d6
| 536830 ||  || — || November 1, 2007 || Kitt Peak || Spacewatch ||  || align=right | 2.9 km || 
|-id=831 bgcolor=#d6d6d6
| 536831 ||  || — || September 25, 2007 || Mount Lemmon || Mount Lemmon Survey ||  || align=right | 3.5 km || 
|-id=832 bgcolor=#fefefe
| 536832 ||  || — || February 19, 2015 || Kitt Peak || Spacewatch ||  || align=right data-sort-value="0.65" | 650 m || 
|-id=833 bgcolor=#E9E9E9
| 536833 ||  || — || October 30, 2005 || Socorro || LINEAR ||  || align=right data-sort-value="0.95" | 950 m || 
|-id=834 bgcolor=#d6d6d6
| 536834 ||  || — || December 2, 2008 || Kitt Peak || Spacewatch ||  || align=right | 2.0 km || 
|-id=835 bgcolor=#E9E9E9
| 536835 ||  || — || November 4, 2004 || Kitt Peak || Spacewatch || DOR || align=right | 2.1 km || 
|-id=836 bgcolor=#E9E9E9
| 536836 ||  || — || March 14, 2011 || Mount Lemmon || Mount Lemmon Survey ||  || align=right data-sort-value="0.69" | 690 m || 
|-id=837 bgcolor=#d6d6d6
| 536837 ||  || — || January 19, 2015 || Mount Lemmon || Mount Lemmon Survey ||  || align=right | 3.0 km || 
|-id=838 bgcolor=#E9E9E9
| 536838 ||  || — || February 23, 2015 || Haleakala || Pan-STARRS ||  || align=right | 1.6 km || 
|-id=839 bgcolor=#E9E9E9
| 536839 ||  || — || June 10, 2007 || Kitt Peak || Spacewatch ||  || align=right data-sort-value="0.90" | 900 m || 
|-id=840 bgcolor=#E9E9E9
| 536840 ||  || — || April 14, 2011 || Mount Lemmon || Mount Lemmon Survey ||  || align=right | 1.0 km || 
|-id=841 bgcolor=#E9E9E9
| 536841 ||  || — || November 12, 2013 || Kitt Peak || Spacewatch ||  || align=right | 1.5 km || 
|-id=842 bgcolor=#fefefe
| 536842 ||  || — || February 7, 2007 || Kitt Peak || Spacewatch ||  || align=right data-sort-value="0.78" | 780 m || 
|-id=843 bgcolor=#E9E9E9
| 536843 ||  || — || February 7, 2006 || Mount Lemmon || Mount Lemmon Survey || EUN || align=right | 1.5 km || 
|-id=844 bgcolor=#d6d6d6
| 536844 ||  || — || August 19, 2006 || Kitt Peak || Spacewatch ||  || align=right | 2.5 km || 
|-id=845 bgcolor=#d6d6d6
| 536845 ||  || — || January 12, 2010 || WISE || WISE ||  || align=right | 2.3 km || 
|-id=846 bgcolor=#E9E9E9
| 536846 ||  || — || February 25, 2011 || Kitt Peak || Spacewatch ||  || align=right data-sort-value="0.68" | 680 m || 
|-id=847 bgcolor=#E9E9E9
| 536847 ||  || — || February 18, 2015 || Haleakala || Pan-STARRS || KON || align=right | 2.4 km || 
|-id=848 bgcolor=#E9E9E9
| 536848 ||  || — || November 26, 2009 || Mount Lemmon || Mount Lemmon Survey ||  || align=right | 1.8 km || 
|-id=849 bgcolor=#fefefe
| 536849 ||  || — || May 9, 2004 || Kitt Peak || Spacewatch ||  || align=right data-sort-value="0.71" | 710 m || 
|-id=850 bgcolor=#fefefe
| 536850 ||  || — || February 18, 2015 || Haleakala || Pan-STARRS ||  || align=right data-sort-value="0.68" | 680 m || 
|-id=851 bgcolor=#E9E9E9
| 536851 ||  || — || April 26, 2011 || Mount Lemmon || Mount Lemmon Survey ||  || align=right | 1.2 km || 
|-id=852 bgcolor=#d6d6d6
| 536852 ||  || — || September 18, 2007 || Kitt Peak || Spacewatch ||  || align=right | 2.5 km || 
|-id=853 bgcolor=#fefefe
| 536853 ||  || — || November 4, 2013 || Mount Lemmon || Mount Lemmon Survey ||  || align=right data-sort-value="0.76" | 760 m || 
|-id=854 bgcolor=#d6d6d6
| 536854 ||  || — || October 10, 2007 || Kitt Peak || Spacewatch ||  || align=right | 2.7 km || 
|-id=855 bgcolor=#fefefe
| 536855 ||  || — || January 10, 2011 || Mount Lemmon || Mount Lemmon Survey ||  || align=right data-sort-value="0.72" | 720 m || 
|-id=856 bgcolor=#d6d6d6
| 536856 ||  || — || August 21, 2006 || Kitt Peak || Spacewatch ||  || align=right | 2.9 km || 
|-id=857 bgcolor=#d6d6d6
| 536857 ||  || — || March 13, 2005 || Mount Lemmon || Mount Lemmon Survey ||  || align=right | 2.7 km || 
|-id=858 bgcolor=#E9E9E9
| 536858 ||  || — || February 16, 2015 || XuYi || PMO NEO ||  || align=right | 2.1 km || 
|-id=859 bgcolor=#d6d6d6
| 536859 ||  || — || April 13, 2004 || Kitt Peak || Spacewatch ||  || align=right | 3.1 km || 
|-id=860 bgcolor=#E9E9E9
| 536860 ||  || — || March 11, 2011 || Kitt Peak || Spacewatch ||  || align=right data-sort-value="0.82" | 820 m || 
|-id=861 bgcolor=#d6d6d6
| 536861 ||  || — || November 29, 2013 || Mount Lemmon || Mount Lemmon Survey || EOS || align=right | 1.7 km || 
|-id=862 bgcolor=#E9E9E9
| 536862 ||  || — || January 21, 2015 || Haleakala || Pan-STARRS ||  || align=right | 1.7 km || 
|-id=863 bgcolor=#E9E9E9
| 536863 ||  || — || November 1, 2008 || Mount Lemmon || Mount Lemmon Survey ||  || align=right | 2.0 km || 
|-id=864 bgcolor=#E9E9E9
| 536864 ||  || — || February 25, 2015 || Haleakala || Pan-STARRS ||  || align=right | 1.6 km || 
|-id=865 bgcolor=#E9E9E9
| 536865 ||  || — || March 29, 2011 || Kitt Peak || Spacewatch ||  || align=right data-sort-value="0.87" | 870 m || 
|-id=866 bgcolor=#d6d6d6
| 536866 ||  || — || December 7, 2008 || Mount Lemmon || Mount Lemmon Survey ||  || align=right | 3.4 km || 
|-id=867 bgcolor=#E9E9E9
| 536867 ||  || — || September 17, 2012 || Mount Lemmon || Mount Lemmon Survey ||  || align=right | 2.1 km || 
|-id=868 bgcolor=#E9E9E9
| 536868 ||  || — || September 29, 2003 || Socorro || LINEAR ||  || align=right data-sort-value="0.88" | 880 m || 
|-id=869 bgcolor=#E9E9E9
| 536869 ||  || — || May 24, 2011 || Haleakala || Pan-STARRS ||  || align=right | 1.6 km || 
|-id=870 bgcolor=#d6d6d6
| 536870 ||  || — || November 13, 2006 || Catalina || CSS ||  || align=right | 3.5 km || 
|-id=871 bgcolor=#E9E9E9
| 536871 ||  || — || April 30, 2011 || Haleakala || Pan-STARRS || EUN || align=right | 1.0 km || 
|-id=872 bgcolor=#d6d6d6
| 536872 ||  || — || October 20, 2007 || Mount Lemmon || Mount Lemmon Survey ||  || align=right | 2.4 km || 
|-id=873 bgcolor=#E9E9E9
| 536873 ||  || — || February 27, 2006 || Kitt Peak || Spacewatch ||  || align=right | 1.7 km || 
|-id=874 bgcolor=#E9E9E9
| 536874 ||  || — || May 28, 2010 || WISE || WISE || CLO || align=right | 1.8 km || 
|-id=875 bgcolor=#E9E9E9
| 536875 ||  || — || January 18, 2002 || Cima Ekar || ADAS ||  || align=right | 1.2 km || 
|-id=876 bgcolor=#d6d6d6
| 536876 ||  || — || November 4, 2007 || Mount Lemmon || Mount Lemmon Survey ||  || align=right | 2.9 km || 
|-id=877 bgcolor=#E9E9E9
| 536877 ||  || — || April 30, 2011 || Haleakala || Pan-STARRS ||  || align=right data-sort-value="0.91" | 910 m || 
|-id=878 bgcolor=#E9E9E9
| 536878 ||  || — || October 21, 2012 || Mount Lemmon || Mount Lemmon Survey ||  || align=right | 1.0 km || 
|-id=879 bgcolor=#E9E9E9
| 536879 ||  || — || March 28, 2015 || Haleakala || Pan-STARRS ||  || align=right | 1.6 km || 
|-id=880 bgcolor=#d6d6d6
| 536880 ||  || — || January 29, 2009 || Mount Lemmon || Mount Lemmon Survey ||  || align=right | 2.0 km || 
|-id=881 bgcolor=#E9E9E9
| 536881 ||  || — || April 27, 2011 || Mount Lemmon || Mount Lemmon Survey ||  || align=right data-sort-value="0.92" | 920 m || 
|-id=882 bgcolor=#E9E9E9
| 536882 ||  || — || March 28, 2015 || Haleakala || Pan-STARRS ||  || align=right | 1.3 km || 
|-id=883 bgcolor=#E9E9E9
| 536883 ||  || — || April 14, 2002 || Kitt Peak || Spacewatch ||  || align=right | 1.3 km || 
|-id=884 bgcolor=#d6d6d6
| 536884 ||  || — || October 9, 2007 || Mount Lemmon || Mount Lemmon Survey || (5651) || align=right | 2.8 km || 
|-id=885 bgcolor=#E9E9E9
| 536885 ||  || — || February 6, 2006 || Kitt Peak || Spacewatch ||  || align=right | 1.6 km || 
|-id=886 bgcolor=#d6d6d6
| 536886 ||  || — || January 8, 2010 || Mount Lemmon || Mount Lemmon Survey ||  || align=right | 1.6 km || 
|-id=887 bgcolor=#E9E9E9
| 536887 ||  || — || March 25, 2015 || Haleakala || Pan-STARRS ||  || align=right | 1.9 km || 
|-id=888 bgcolor=#E9E9E9
| 536888 ||  || — || December 24, 2013 || Mount Lemmon || Mount Lemmon Survey || MRX || align=right data-sort-value="0.95" | 950 m || 
|-id=889 bgcolor=#E9E9E9
| 536889 ||  || — || October 24, 2013 || Mount Lemmon || Mount Lemmon Survey ||  || align=right | 1.8 km || 
|-id=890 bgcolor=#E9E9E9
| 536890 ||  || — || March 25, 2015 || Haleakala || Pan-STARRS ||  || align=right | 1.3 km || 
|-id=891 bgcolor=#E9E9E9
| 536891 ||  || — || April 22, 2007 || Mount Lemmon || Mount Lemmon Survey ||  || align=right data-sort-value="0.72" | 720 m || 
|-id=892 bgcolor=#d6d6d6
| 536892 ||  || — || November 6, 2007 || Mount Lemmon || Mount Lemmon Survey ||  || align=right | 3.2 km || 
|-id=893 bgcolor=#E9E9E9
| 536893 ||  || — || January 23, 2015 || Haleakala || Pan-STARRS ||  || align=right data-sort-value="0.79" | 790 m || 
|-id=894 bgcolor=#d6d6d6
| 536894 ||  || — || November 26, 2013 || Haleakala || Pan-STARRS ||  || align=right | 2.1 km || 
|-id=895 bgcolor=#E9E9E9
| 536895 ||  || — || April 14, 2011 || Mount Lemmon || Mount Lemmon Survey ||  || align=right data-sort-value="0.94" | 940 m || 
|-id=896 bgcolor=#d6d6d6
| 536896 ||  || — || April 9, 2010 || Mount Lemmon || Mount Lemmon Survey ||  || align=right | 2.4 km || 
|-id=897 bgcolor=#d6d6d6
| 536897 ||  || — || October 6, 2012 || Haleakala || Pan-STARRS ||  || align=right | 3.6 km || 
|-id=898 bgcolor=#d6d6d6
| 536898 ||  || — || March 15, 2004 || Kitt Peak || Spacewatch ||  || align=right | 2.7 km || 
|-id=899 bgcolor=#d6d6d6
| 536899 ||  || — || December 11, 2013 || Haleakala || Pan-STARRS ||  || align=right | 2.4 km || 
|-id=900 bgcolor=#E9E9E9
| 536900 ||  || — || January 22, 2006 || Anderson Mesa || LONEOS ||  || align=right | 1.7 km || 
|}

536901–537000 

|-bgcolor=#E9E9E9
| 536901 ||  || — || May 22, 2006 || Kitt Peak || Spacewatch ||  || align=right | 2.2 km || 
|-id=902 bgcolor=#d6d6d6
| 536902 ||  || — || January 29, 2009 || Mount Lemmon || Mount Lemmon Survey || EOS || align=right | 1.9 km || 
|-id=903 bgcolor=#E9E9E9
| 536903 ||  || — || October 31, 2013 || Mount Lemmon || Mount Lemmon Survey ||  || align=right data-sort-value="0.67" | 670 m || 
|-id=904 bgcolor=#E9E9E9
| 536904 ||  || — || November 27, 2013 || Haleakala || Pan-STARRS ||  || align=right data-sort-value="0.75" | 750 m || 
|-id=905 bgcolor=#d6d6d6
| 536905 ||  || — || November 8, 2007 || Kitt Peak || Spacewatch || VER || align=right | 2.3 km || 
|-id=906 bgcolor=#d6d6d6
| 536906 ||  || — || October 14, 2007 || Mount Lemmon || Mount Lemmon Survey || EOS || align=right | 1.4 km || 
|-id=907 bgcolor=#d6d6d6
| 536907 ||  || — || June 16, 2010 || WISE || WISE ||  || align=right | 3.5 km || 
|-id=908 bgcolor=#d6d6d6
| 536908 ||  || — || April 14, 2005 || Kitt Peak || Spacewatch || EOS || align=right | 2.7 km || 
|-id=909 bgcolor=#fefefe
| 536909 ||  || — || January 22, 2015 || Haleakala || Pan-STARRS ||  || align=right data-sort-value="0.98" | 980 m || 
|-id=910 bgcolor=#E9E9E9
| 536910 ||  || — || March 30, 2015 || Haleakala || Pan-STARRS || MAR || align=right data-sort-value="0.84" | 840 m || 
|-id=911 bgcolor=#E9E9E9
| 536911 ||  || — || February 27, 2015 || Haleakala || Pan-STARRS ||  || align=right | 2.0 km || 
|-id=912 bgcolor=#E9E9E9
| 536912 ||  || — || March 30, 2015 || Haleakala || Pan-STARRS ||  || align=right | 1.3 km || 
|-id=913 bgcolor=#E9E9E9
| 536913 ||  || — || September 14, 2007 || Mount Lemmon || Mount Lemmon Survey ||  || align=right | 1.7 km || 
|-id=914 bgcolor=#E9E9E9
| 536914 ||  || — || October 20, 2012 || Haleakala || Pan-STARRS ||  || align=right | 1.3 km || 
|-id=915 bgcolor=#E9E9E9
| 536915 ||  || — || April 27, 2011 || Kitt Peak || Spacewatch ||  || align=right data-sort-value="0.71" | 710 m || 
|-id=916 bgcolor=#E9E9E9
| 536916 ||  || — || January 26, 2015 || Haleakala || Pan-STARRS ||  || align=right | 1.8 km || 
|-id=917 bgcolor=#E9E9E9
| 536917 ||  || — || April 3, 2010 || WISE || WISE ||  || align=right | 3.1 km || 
|-id=918 bgcolor=#E9E9E9
| 536918 ||  || — || January 19, 2010 || WISE || WISE ||  || align=right | 2.2 km || 
|-id=919 bgcolor=#C2E0FF
| 536919 ||  || — || February 1, 2011 || Haleakala || Pan-STARRS || cubewano (hot) || align=right | 293 km || 
|-id=920 bgcolor=#C2E0FF
| 536920 ||  || — || May 10, 2010 || Haleakala || Pan-STARRS || other TNO || align=right | 243 km || 
|-id=921 bgcolor=#C2E0FF
| 536921 ||  || — || March 29, 2012 || Haleakala || Pan-STARRS || other TNO || align=right | 168 km || 
|-id=922 bgcolor=#C2E0FF
| 536922 ||  || — || January 29, 2011 || Haleakala || Pan-STARRS || res4:7 || align=right | 186 km || 
|-id=923 bgcolor=#d6d6d6
| 536923 ||  || — || October 12, 2007 || Mount Lemmon || Mount Lemmon Survey ||  || align=right | 2.6 km || 
|-id=924 bgcolor=#E9E9E9
| 536924 ||  || — || July 5, 2005 || Kitt Peak || Spacewatch ||  || align=right | 1.2 km || 
|-id=925 bgcolor=#d6d6d6
| 536925 ||  || — || October 18, 2012 || Haleakala || Pan-STARRS ||  || align=right | 2.4 km || 
|-id=926 bgcolor=#fefefe
| 536926 ||  || — || March 30, 2011 || Mount Lemmon || Mount Lemmon Survey ||  || align=right data-sort-value="0.86" | 860 m || 
|-id=927 bgcolor=#E9E9E9
| 536927 ||  || — || November 8, 2009 || Mount Lemmon || Mount Lemmon Survey ||  || align=right data-sort-value="0.97" | 970 m || 
|-id=928 bgcolor=#d6d6d6
| 536928 ||  || — || November 19, 2008 || Kitt Peak || Spacewatch ||  || align=right | 2.7 km || 
|-id=929 bgcolor=#d6d6d6
| 536929 ||  || — || October 24, 2008 || Kitt Peak || Spacewatch ||  || align=right | 1.9 km || 
|-id=930 bgcolor=#d6d6d6
| 536930 ||  || — || October 9, 2007 || Catalina || CSS ||  || align=right | 3.4 km || 
|-id=931 bgcolor=#E9E9E9
| 536931 ||  || — || March 26, 2011 || Haleakala || Pan-STARRS ||  || align=right data-sort-value="0.98" | 980 m || 
|-id=932 bgcolor=#E9E9E9
| 536932 ||  || — || January 28, 2015 || Haleakala || Pan-STARRS ||  || align=right | 2.1 km || 
|-id=933 bgcolor=#d6d6d6
| 536933 ||  || — || December 6, 2013 || Haleakala || Pan-STARRS ||  || align=right | 2.2 km || 
|-id=934 bgcolor=#fefefe
| 536934 ||  || — || March 18, 2015 || Haleakala || Pan-STARRS ||  || align=right data-sort-value="0.87" | 870 m || 
|-id=935 bgcolor=#E9E9E9
| 536935 ||  || — || May 10, 2007 || Mount Lemmon || Mount Lemmon Survey ||  || align=right data-sort-value="0.75" | 750 m || 
|-id=936 bgcolor=#d6d6d6
| 536936 ||  || — || October 16, 2007 || Mount Lemmon || Mount Lemmon Survey || EOS || align=right | 1.8 km || 
|-id=937 bgcolor=#d6d6d6
| 536937 ||  || — || December 22, 2008 || Mount Lemmon || Mount Lemmon Survey ||  || align=right | 2.6 km || 
|-id=938 bgcolor=#d6d6d6
| 536938 ||  || — || January 3, 2009 || Mount Lemmon || Mount Lemmon Survey ||  || align=right | 2.8 km || 
|-id=939 bgcolor=#d6d6d6
| 536939 ||  || — || September 25, 2012 || Mount Lemmon || Mount Lemmon Survey ||  || align=right | 2.5 km || 
|-id=940 bgcolor=#E9E9E9
| 536940 ||  || — || October 21, 2004 || Socorro || LINEAR ||  || align=right | 2.9 km || 
|-id=941 bgcolor=#d6d6d6
| 536941 ||  || — || January 1, 2009 || Kitt Peak || Spacewatch ||  || align=right | 2.6 km || 
|-id=942 bgcolor=#E9E9E9
| 536942 ||  || — || November 27, 2013 || Haleakala || Pan-STARRS ||  || align=right | 2.0 km || 
|-id=943 bgcolor=#d6d6d6
| 536943 ||  || — || September 13, 2007 || Kitt Peak || Spacewatch ||  || align=right | 3.5 km || 
|-id=944 bgcolor=#E9E9E9
| 536944 ||  || — || June 17, 2007 || Kitt Peak || Spacewatch ||  || align=right data-sort-value="0.69" | 690 m || 
|-id=945 bgcolor=#E9E9E9
| 536945 ||  || — || January 10, 2010 || Kitt Peak || Spacewatch ||  || align=right | 1.7 km || 
|-id=946 bgcolor=#fefefe
| 536946 ||  || — || September 10, 2013 || Haleakala || Pan-STARRS ||  || align=right data-sort-value="0.75" | 750 m || 
|-id=947 bgcolor=#fefefe
| 536947 ||  || — || March 29, 2015 || Haleakala || Pan-STARRS || H || align=right data-sort-value="0.49" | 490 m || 
|-id=948 bgcolor=#E9E9E9
| 536948 ||  || — || October 2, 2008 || Mount Lemmon || Mount Lemmon Survey ||  || align=right | 1.7 km || 
|-id=949 bgcolor=#E9E9E9
| 536949 ||  || — || March 22, 2015 || Haleakala || Pan-STARRS ||  || align=right | 1.2 km || 
|-id=950 bgcolor=#d6d6d6
| 536950 ||  || — || October 24, 2013 || Mount Lemmon || Mount Lemmon Survey ||  || align=right | 2.8 km || 
|-id=951 bgcolor=#E9E9E9
| 536951 ||  || — || October 18, 2012 || Haleakala || Pan-STARRS ||  || align=right | 1.7 km || 
|-id=952 bgcolor=#E9E9E9
| 536952 ||  || — || December 11, 2013 || Haleakala || Pan-STARRS ||  || align=right data-sort-value="0.92" | 920 m || 
|-id=953 bgcolor=#d6d6d6
| 536953 ||  || — || October 20, 2012 || Haleakala || Pan-STARRS ||  || align=right | 2.8 km || 
|-id=954 bgcolor=#d6d6d6
| 536954 ||  || — || March 1, 2009 || Kitt Peak || Spacewatch ||  || align=right | 2.6 km || 
|-id=955 bgcolor=#E9E9E9
| 536955 ||  || — || March 9, 2006 || Mount Lemmon || Mount Lemmon Survey ||  || align=right | 1.4 km || 
|-id=956 bgcolor=#E9E9E9
| 536956 ||  || — || March 22, 2015 || Haleakala || Pan-STARRS ||  || align=right | 2.0 km || 
|-id=957 bgcolor=#d6d6d6
| 536957 ||  || — || April 16, 2004 || Kitt Peak || Spacewatch ||  || align=right | 3.3 km || 
|-id=958 bgcolor=#E9E9E9
| 536958 ||  || — || February 14, 2010 || Kitt Peak || Spacewatch ||  || align=right | 1.5 km || 
|-id=959 bgcolor=#d6d6d6
| 536959 ||  || — || October 3, 2006 || Mount Lemmon || Mount Lemmon Survey ||  || align=right | 2.9 km || 
|-id=960 bgcolor=#fefefe
| 536960 ||  || — || March 9, 2007 || Mount Lemmon || Mount Lemmon Survey ||  || align=right data-sort-value="0.73" | 730 m || 
|-id=961 bgcolor=#d6d6d6
| 536961 ||  || — || October 3, 2006 || Mount Lemmon || Mount Lemmon Survey ||  || align=right | 3.3 km || 
|-id=962 bgcolor=#fefefe
| 536962 ||  || — || March 10, 2011 || Kitt Peak || Spacewatch ||  || align=right data-sort-value="0.69" | 690 m || 
|-id=963 bgcolor=#E9E9E9
| 536963 ||  || — || March 25, 2011 || Kitt Peak || Spacewatch ||  || align=right data-sort-value="0.88" | 880 m || 
|-id=964 bgcolor=#fefefe
| 536964 ||  || — || January 27, 2007 || Mount Lemmon || Mount Lemmon Survey ||  || align=right data-sort-value="0.57" | 570 m || 
|-id=965 bgcolor=#d6d6d6
| 536965 ||  || — || April 1, 2009 || Mount Lemmon || Mount Lemmon Survey ||  || align=right | 3.1 km || 
|-id=966 bgcolor=#d6d6d6
| 536966 ||  || — || October 21, 2012 || Mount Lemmon || Mount Lemmon Survey ||  || align=right | 2.1 km || 
|-id=967 bgcolor=#d6d6d6
| 536967 ||  || — || October 17, 2012 || Mount Lemmon || Mount Lemmon Survey ||  || align=right | 2.9 km || 
|-id=968 bgcolor=#d6d6d6
| 536968 ||  || — || September 11, 2007 || Mount Lemmon || Mount Lemmon Survey ||  || align=right | 2.3 km || 
|-id=969 bgcolor=#E9E9E9
| 536969 ||  || — || January 28, 2015 || Haleakala || Pan-STARRS ||  || align=right data-sort-value="0.96" | 960 m || 
|-id=970 bgcolor=#E9E9E9
| 536970 ||  || — || December 9, 2012 || Haleakala || Pan-STARRS ||  || align=right | 2.8 km || 
|-id=971 bgcolor=#E9E9E9
| 536971 ||  || — || October 9, 2012 || Mount Lemmon || Mount Lemmon Survey ||  || align=right | 1.6 km || 
|-id=972 bgcolor=#d6d6d6
| 536972 ||  || — || November 12, 2007 || Mount Lemmon || Mount Lemmon Survey ||  || align=right | 2.4 km || 
|-id=973 bgcolor=#E9E9E9
| 536973 ||  || — || December 11, 2013 || Haleakala || Pan-STARRS ||  || align=right | 1.5 km || 
|-id=974 bgcolor=#E9E9E9
| 536974 ||  || — || February 2, 2009 || Mount Lemmon || Mount Lemmon Survey ||  || align=right | 2.3 km || 
|-id=975 bgcolor=#E9E9E9
| 536975 ||  || — || March 25, 2010 || Kitt Peak || Spacewatch ||  || align=right | 1.7 km || 
|-id=976 bgcolor=#d6d6d6
| 536976 ||  || — || November 13, 2012 || Mount Lemmon || Mount Lemmon Survey ||  || align=right | 2.6 km || 
|-id=977 bgcolor=#d6d6d6
| 536977 ||  || — || July 28, 2011 || Haleakala || Pan-STARRS ||  || align=right | 2.7 km || 
|-id=978 bgcolor=#d6d6d6
| 536978 ||  || — || January 15, 2009 || Kitt Peak || Spacewatch ||  || align=right | 1.8 km || 
|-id=979 bgcolor=#E9E9E9
| 536979 ||  || — || November 7, 2008 || Mount Lemmon || Mount Lemmon Survey ||  || align=right | 1.3 km || 
|-id=980 bgcolor=#E9E9E9
| 536980 ||  || — || January 8, 2010 || Kitt Peak || Spacewatch ||  || align=right | 1.6 km || 
|-id=981 bgcolor=#E9E9E9
| 536981 ||  || — || March 24, 2015 || Mount Lemmon || Mount Lemmon Survey ||  || align=right | 1.2 km || 
|-id=982 bgcolor=#E9E9E9
| 536982 ||  || — || March 27, 2015 || Haleakala || Pan-STARRS ||  || align=right | 2.2 km || 
|-id=983 bgcolor=#E9E9E9
| 536983 ||  || — || March 28, 2015 || Haleakala || Pan-STARRS ||  || align=right | 1.3 km || 
|-id=984 bgcolor=#E9E9E9
| 536984 ||  || — || March 17, 2015 || Haleakala || Pan-STARRS ||  || align=right | 2.3 km || 
|-id=985 bgcolor=#E9E9E9
| 536985 ||  || — || November 4, 2012 || Mount Lemmon || Mount Lemmon Survey ||  || align=right | 1.4 km || 
|-id=986 bgcolor=#d6d6d6
| 536986 ||  || — || April 14, 2010 || WISE || WISE ||  || align=right | 3.0 km || 
|-id=987 bgcolor=#d6d6d6
| 536987 ||  || — || January 29, 2009 || Mount Lemmon || Mount Lemmon Survey ||  || align=right | 2.3 km || 
|-id=988 bgcolor=#d6d6d6
| 536988 ||  || — || July 16, 2010 || WISE || WISE ||  || align=right | 2.1 km || 
|-id=989 bgcolor=#d6d6d6
| 536989 ||  || — || January 3, 2009 || Mount Lemmon || Mount Lemmon Survey ||  || align=right | 2.1 km || 
|-id=990 bgcolor=#E9E9E9
| 536990 ||  || — || February 9, 2014 || Kitt Peak || Spacewatch ||  || align=right | 2.4 km || 
|-id=991 bgcolor=#E9E9E9
| 536991 ||  || — || September 25, 2008 || Kitt Peak || Spacewatch ||  || align=right | 1.7 km || 
|-id=992 bgcolor=#d6d6d6
| 536992 ||  || — || October 17, 2012 || Haleakala || Pan-STARRS ||  || align=right | 2.4 km || 
|-id=993 bgcolor=#d6d6d6
| 536993 ||  || — || March 18, 2010 || Mount Lemmon || Mount Lemmon Survey ||  || align=right | 2.0 km || 
|-id=994 bgcolor=#d6d6d6
| 536994 ||  || — || October 26, 2012 || Haleakala || Pan-STARRS ||  || align=right | 2.9 km || 
|-id=995 bgcolor=#fefefe
| 536995 ||  || — || August 13, 2012 || Haleakala || Pan-STARRS ||  || align=right data-sort-value="0.75" | 750 m || 
|-id=996 bgcolor=#E9E9E9
| 536996 ||  || — || January 28, 2015 || Haleakala || Pan-STARRS ||  || align=right | 1.4 km || 
|-id=997 bgcolor=#d6d6d6
| 536997 ||  || — || October 18, 2012 || Haleakala || Pan-STARRS ||  || align=right | 2.6 km || 
|-id=998 bgcolor=#E9E9E9
| 536998 ||  || — || December 18, 2009 || Kitt Peak || Spacewatch ||  || align=right | 1.0 km || 
|-id=999 bgcolor=#d6d6d6
| 536999 ||  || — || February 22, 2003 || Kitt Peak || Spacewatch ||  || align=right | 3.1 km || 
|-id=000 bgcolor=#E9E9E9
| 537000 ||  || — || July 21, 2003 || Campo Imperatore || CINEOS ||  || align=right | 1.8 km || 
|}

References

External links 
 Discovery Circumstances: Numbered Minor Planets (535001)–(540000) (IAU Minor Planet Center)

0536